= Tooth loss =

Process of tooth falling out

Tooth loss is a process in which one or more teeth come loose and fall out. Tooth loss is normal for deciduous teeth (baby teeth), when they are replaced by a person's adult teeth. Otherwise, losing teeth is undesirable and is the result of injury or disease, such as dental avulsion, tooth decay, and gum disease. The condition of being toothless or missing one or more teeth is called edentulism. Tooth loss has been shown to causally reduce overall health and wellbeing as it increases the probability of depression.

Tooth regeneration is an ongoing stem cell–based field of study that aims to find methods to reverse the effects of tooth loss; current methods are based on easing symptoms.

== Tooth exfoliation in children ==
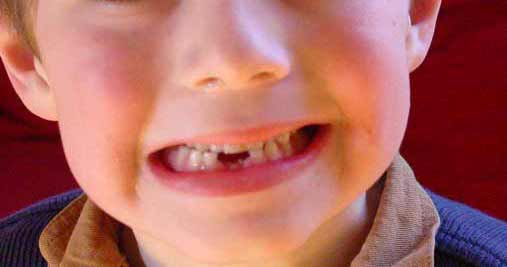
A young boy after losing two baby teeth, exfoliated in response to the permanent teeth beneath, which will erupt through the gums to take their place

Normal loss of primary teeth typically begins around age six and continues until age twelve. The upper and lower central incisors are shed at age six to seven years. The upper and lower lateral incisors are shed at seven to eight years. The upper canines are shed at ten to twelve years. The lower canines are shed at nine to twelve years. The upper and lower first molars are shed at nine to eleven years. The upper and lower second molars are shed at ten to twelve years.

== Pathological tooth loss ==
=== Causes and prevention ===
As a person ages, their permanent teeth have been exposed to normal mechanical forces, such as chewing, and also more abnormal mechanical forces, such as bruxism and traumatic injury. Permanent teeth may also be affected by oral disease. There are many ways in which a person may protect their permanent teeth from loss.

The main method of preventing tooth loss is prevention of oral diseases. Tooth loss can be due to tooth decay and gum disease. Tooth decay is caused by increased plaque retention. Bacteria can then invade the plaque and cause dental caries (cavities). If cavities persist untreated for an extended period of time, tooth breakdown occurs. Plaque retention and bacterial presence also affect the gums and bone and their ability to hold the teeth in place. Disease of the gums, known as periodontitis, leads to detachment of the supporting structures from the teeth and their eventual loss. Tooth loss due to tooth decay and gum disease may be prevented by practicing good oral hygiene, and regular check-ups at a dentist's office. Good oral hygiene consists of brushing two times a day with a fluoridated toothpaste and flossing. Dental check-ups should occur every six months. Children or adults who are incapable of caring for their own teeth should be assisted with oral hygiene in order to prevent tooth loss.

In contact sports, risk of mouth trauma and tooth injury is reduced by wearing mouthguards and helmets with a facemask (e.g., a football helmet, a goalie mask).

Nightguards may also be implemented in the case of teeth grinding (bruxism) during sleep. These guards function in limiting the wear and force applied to the teeth. In turn, this minimizes the chance of loss.

In countries such as the United States, Japan, Germany, and Italy, there is a strong relationship between cigarette smoking and tooth loss. Studies have shown that an increase in exposure to cigarette smoking can increase the risk of tooth loss. In addition, studies have also found that when people stop smoking, there is a decrease in tooth loss.

Proper nutrition has been shown to prevent tooth loss by providing the nutrients necessary to maintain enamel strength.

Tooth loss occurs more often in people from the lower end of the socioeconomic scale.

==== Secondary to disease ====
Tooth loss can occur secondary or concomitantly to many diseases. Diseases may cause periodontal disease or bone loss to prompt tooth loss. Consequently, periodontal disease may cause increased infection, which may predispose a person to other diseases. Diseases commonly related to tooth loss include, but are not limited to: cardiovascular disease, cancer, osteoporosis and diabetes mellitus. Therefore, it is important to not only maintain good oral hygiene, but also overall good health.

=== Missing tooth replacement ===
Maximum preservation and protection of natural teeth is best for eating and chewing; however, there are three basic ways to replace a missing tooth or teeth, including a fixed dental bridge, dentures, and dental implants. Each alternative has its own benefits and drawbacks. The patient's medical, financial, and emotional situation are considered. It has been shown that a non-removable replacement, such as a bridge or implant appears to provide patients with the best sense of security and well-being.

In some cases, small missing areas can be restored by using techniques such as resin boded bridge (acid etch bridge) and maryland bridge.

==== Research ====
Researchers in Japan have successfully regrown fully functional teeth in mice. Epithelial and mesenchymal cells were extracted from the mice, cultured to produce a tooth "germ", and the germ was then implanted into the bone at the space of a missing tooth. A tooth of the correct external and internal structure, hardness, strength, and sensitivity later erupted in the space, eventually meeting the opposing tooth in a manner similar to an original natural tooth. This technique may be a possible future treatment for replacement of missing teeth.

== See also ==
- Teeth cleaning
  - Tooth brushing
  - Flossing
  - Tongue cleaning
- Dental surgery
- Wisdom tooth
- Dental implant
- Periodontist
