= Tongue cleaner =

Oral hygiene device

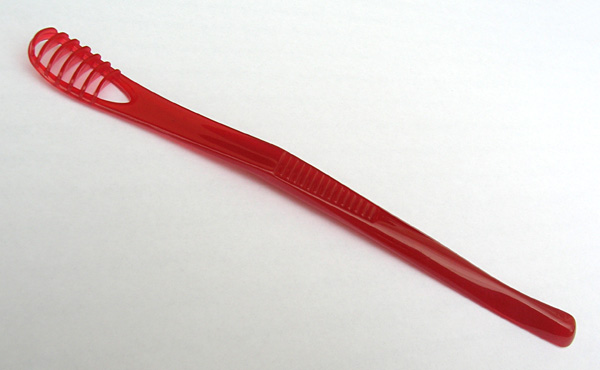
Tongue cleaner

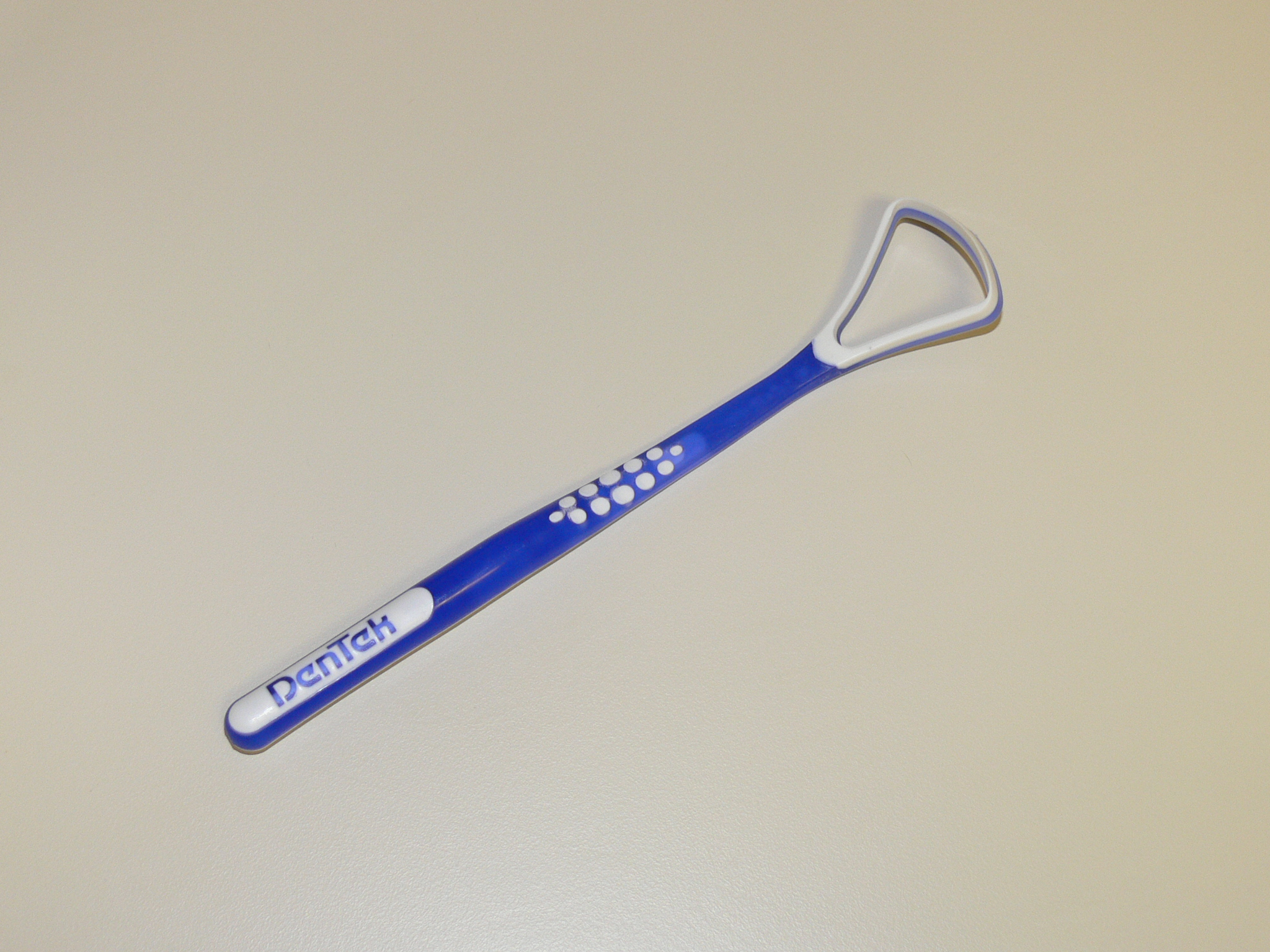
Tongue scraper

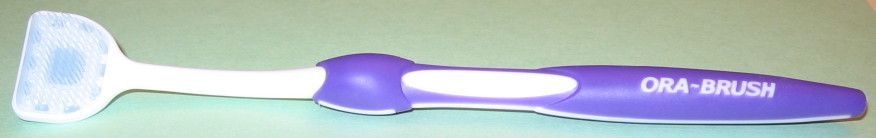
Tongue brush

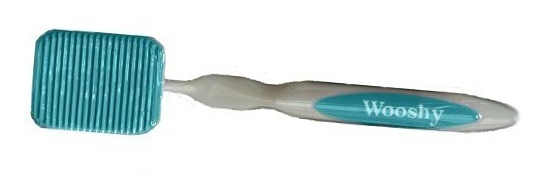
Tongue cleaner

A tongue cleaner (also called a tongue scraper or tongue brush) is an oral hygiene device designed to clean the coating on the upper surface of the tongue. While there may be potential benefits from the use of a tongue cleaner, there are no clear conclusions with respect to bad breath.

The large surface area and lingual papillae are anatomical features of the tongue that promote tongue coating by retaining microorganisms and oral debris consisting of food, saliva and dead epithelial cells. Tongue cleaning is done less often than tooth brushing, flossing, and using mouthwash.

== Health effects ==
=== Breath ===
There are no clear scientific conclusions concerning the beneficial effects of tongue cleaners on bad breath.

Some studies have shown that bacteria on the tongue often produce malodorous compounds and fatty acids that may account for 80–85% of all cases of bad breath. The remaining 15–20% of cases originate from the stomach, the tonsils, decaying food stuck between the teeth, gum disease, dental caries (cavities or tooth decay), or plaque accumulated on the teeth. In addition, degradation of oral debris by microorganisms produces organosulfur compounds (volatile sulphur compounds) on the posterior (rear) of the tongue.

=== Aesthetics ===
The tongue may acquire a white or colored coating due to diet, reduced salivary flow, reduced oral hygiene, or tongue anatomy. The thickness of the tongue coating can also vary. Tongue cleaning can reduce this coating, making the tongue cleaner and helping to return it to its natural pink color.

=== Dental caries and periodontal disease ===
The tongue surface can be a reservoir for tooth pathogens and periodontal pathogens. It can contribute to the recolonization of tooth surfaces. People with periodontal disease are more likely to have a thicker tongue coating and a microbial flora that produces more volatile sulphur compounds than those who have healthy periodontal tissues. Tongue cleaning might help to reduce halitosis, dental caries and periodontal disease.

== Side effects ==
Tongue cleaning can cause discomfort. Improper use of a tongue cleaner may induce the gag reflex and/or vomiting. Aggressive use of a tongue cleaner may also cause irritation or ulcers. Some people have inappropriately used the tongue cleaner to scrape or brush the lingual tonsils (tongue tonsils).

There has been one reported case in which a woman possibly had infective endocarditis from bacteremia following the use of a tongue cleaner. Individuals with previous infective endocarditis and high-risk cardiac valves may be at higher risk from bacteremia.

== History ==
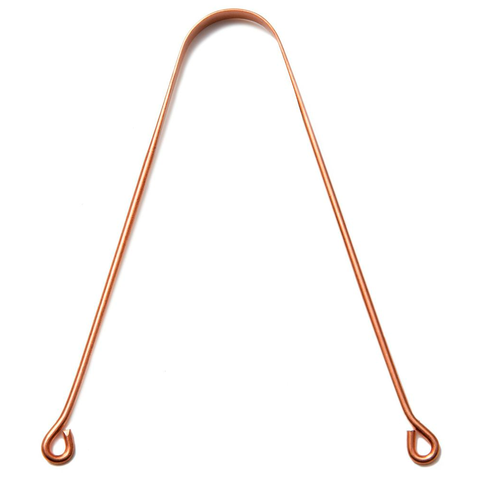
A traditional ayurvedic tongue cleaner made of copper popularly used in the Indian subcontinent

Ayurveda, the practice of traditional Indian medicine, recommends tongue cleaning as part of one's daily hygiene regimen to remove the toxic debris known as Ama. Tongue cleaning has existed in Ayurvedic practice since ancient times, using tongue scrapers made from copper, silver, gold, tin, or brass. In modern times, plastic scrapers are used in India and the Far East.

Tongue hygiene has been practiced for centuries in Africa, Arabia, Europe, South America, and many eastern and oriental cultures. The various materials used for tongue cleaners include thin flexible wood sections, metals, ivory, mother-of-pearl, whalebone, celluloid, tortoiseshell, and plastic.

Western civilizations placed less emphasis on tongue cleaning. Between the 15th and 19th centuries, tongue cleaning was primarily practiced by those who were affluent. In the 18th and 19th centuries, it was recorded in Europe that the Romans also performed tongue cleaning. In the 20th century, a wide variety of tongue cleaning devices were introduced on the commercial market.

== Types ==
The top surface of the tongue can be cleaned using a tongue cleaner, a tongue brush/scraper, or a toothbrush. However, toothbrushes are not considered effective for this purpose because they have a smaller width and are designed for brushing teeth, which have a solid structure unlike the spongy tissue of the tongue. This can reduce their ability to remove debris and microorganisms. Some toothbrush designs have projections on the back of their heads to act as a tongue cleaner.

Ergonomic tongue cleaners are shaped in accordance with the anatomy of the tongue and are optimized to lift and trap the plaque coating and effectively clean the surface of the tongue. There are many different types of tongue cleaners. They can be plastic or metal straps, plastic and/or small brush bristles that form "rakes", or circular devices with handles. Their effectiveness varies depending on the shape, dimensions, configuration, quality of the contact surfaces, and materials used. Tongue cleaners are mostly inexpensive, small, easy to clean, and durable.

== See also ==
- Interdental brush
- Oral irrigator
- Xylitol
