= Tonsil =

Lymphoid organs in the mouth and throat

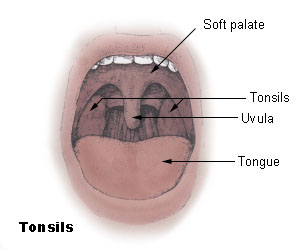

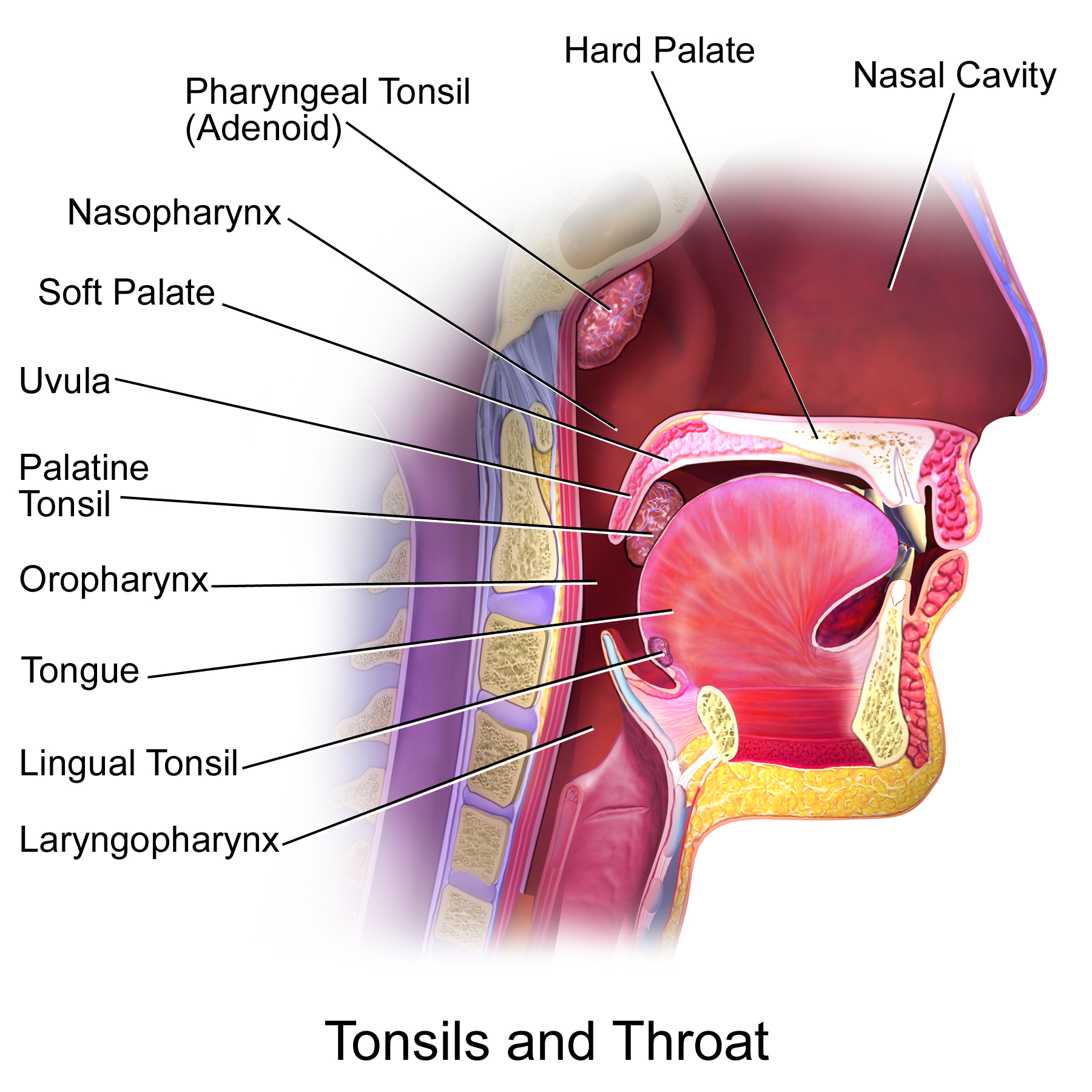
- Sagittal view of tonsils and throat anatomy

Details
- System: Immune system, lymphatic system

Identifiers
- Latin: tonsilla, tonsillae (pl.)
- TA98: A05.2.01.011
- FMA: 9609

The tonsils (/ˈtɒn.səls/ TON-sills) are a set of lymphoid organs facing into the aerodigestive tract, which is known as Waldeyer's tonsillar ring and consists of the adenoid tonsil (or pharyngeal tonsil), two tubal tonsils, two palatine tonsils, and the lingual tonsils. These organs play an important role in the immune system.

When used unqualified, the term most commonly refers specifically to the palatine tonsils, which are two lymphoid organs situated at either side of the back of the human throat. The palatine tonsils and the adenoid tonsil are organs consisting of lymphoepithelial tissue located near the oropharynx and nasopharynx (parts of the throat).

== Structure ==
Humans are born with four types of tonsils: the pharyngeal tonsil, two tubal tonsils, two palatine tonsils and the lingual tonsils.

Type	Epithelium	Capsule	Crypts	Location
Pharyngeal tonsil (also termed "adenoid")	Ciliated pseudostratified columnar (respiratory epithelium)	Incompletely encapsulated	Small folds—sometimes described as crypts	Roof of pharynx
Tubal tonsils	Ciliated pseudostratified columnar (respiratory epithelium)			Roof of pharynx
Palatine tonsils	Non-keratinized stratified squamous	Incompletely encapsulated	Long, branched	Sides of oropharynx between palatoglossal and palatopharyngeal arches
Lingual tonsils	Non-keratinized stratified squamous	Incompletely encapsulated	Long, unbranched	Behind terminal sulcus (tongue)

=== Development ===
The palatine tonsils tend to reach their largest size in puberty, and they gradually undergo atrophy thereafter. However, they are largest relative to the diameter of the throat in young children. In adults, each palatine tonsil normally measures up to 2.5 cm in length, 2.0 cm in width and 1.2 cm in thickness.

The adenoid grows until the age of 5, starts to shrink at the age of 7. It often becomes significantly smaller during adolescence, with marked atrophy in adulthood. In some individuals, persistent hypertrophy can cause nasal obstruction or sleep disturbances.

The lingual tonsils develop more slowly than the palatine and pharyngeal tonsils, becoming prominent later in childhood. They consist of multiple nodules at the base of the tongue and tend to maintain a relatively stable size throughout life. However, mild hypertrophy or inflammation can occur due to chronic irritation or infection.

The tubal tonsils, located near the openings of the Eustachian tubes, are present from birth and develop along with the other components of Waldeyer’s ring. They remain relatively small and are less prominent than other tonsillar tissues. There is limited evidence of significant age-related hypertrophy or atrophy.

== Age-related changes in function ==
Tonsillar tissues exhibit functional and structural changes across the lifespan. In early childhood, they are immunologically active, with high germinal center proliferation, robust B-cell clonal expansion, and somatic hypermutation that supports the development of immunologic memory.

With age, germinal center activity declines, and the innate immune landscape shifts. A recent study showed that aging tonsils accumulate innate immune cells such as mast cells and monocytes expressing CD206 and CD163, indicating altered phagocytic profiles. T-cell activity also declines due to changes in the stromal microenvironment.

These findings suggest that the tonsillar immune function matures and attenuates with age, correlating with the observed size reduction in adulthood.

== Structural and immunological overview of the tonsillar system ==
Tonsils are encapsulated lymphoid structures with specialized crypt epithelium that increases surface area for antigen capture. Palatine tonsils, for instance, have deep invaginations that harbor microbial communities and antigen-presenting cells.

Histologically, tonsils contain lymphoid follicles with germinal centers where B cells undergo affinity maturation. They are covered by stratified squamous epithelium, and the tissue harbors a dense population of dendritic cells, T lymphocytes, and macrophages, creating a potent mucosal immune interface.

This architecture allows the tonsils to function as immune sentinels at the junction of the respiratory and gastrointestinal tracts, forming the Waldeyer's ring.

== Function ==
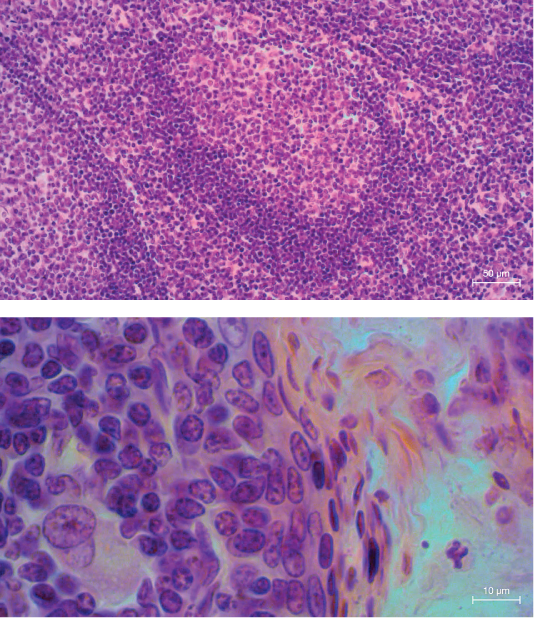
H&E stain of human tonsil tissue section showing morphology and contents of germinal centers

Tonsils are key components of the immune system, acting as the body's first line of defense against inhaled or ingested pathogens. Located at the entrance of the respiratory and digestive tracts, they monitor and respond to microbes by initiating immune responses.

The tonsils contain a dense network of immune cells including B lymphocytes, T lymphocytes, macrophages, and dendritic cells. These cells interact within specialized regions called germinal centers, which become especially active during infections. Within these centers, B cells undergo activation, class switching (changing the type of antibody they produce), and somatic hypermutation of their antibody genes to better recognize and neutralize pathogens.

Tonsils have a unique lymphoepithelial structure, with immune cells embedded within epithelial tissue, creating a direct interface with the external environment. This architecture facilitates efficient sampling of incoming bacteria and viruses through specialized M cells in the epithelium. The crypts in palatine tonsils significantly increase the surface area for antigen sampling, enhancing immune surveillance.

The tonsillar immune response produces various antibodies—particularly immunoglobulins like IgA, IgG, and IgM—which contribute to both local and systemic immunity. Secretory IgA is especially important as it provides mucosal protection against pathogens before they can establish infection.

In essence, the tonsils serve as immune surveillance stations, training grounds for antibody-producing cells, and barriers against infection at the body's entry points.

== Clinical significance ==
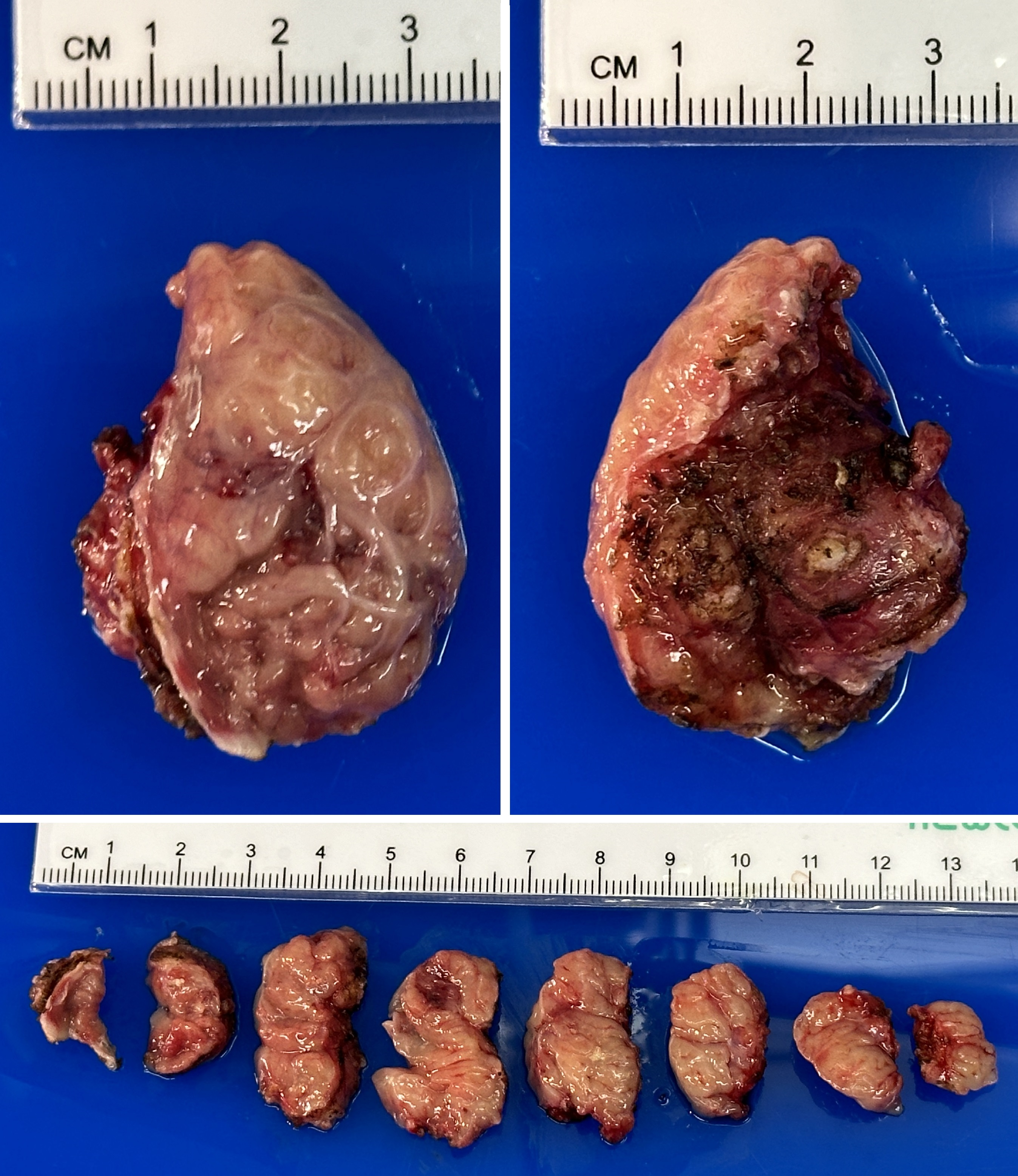
Gross pathology of fresh hypertrophic tonsil. Top left: Surface facing into the aerodigestive tract. Top right: Opposite surface (cauterized). Bottom: Cut sections.

The palatine tonsils can become enlarged (adenotonsillar hyperplasia) or inflamed (tonsillitis). The most common way to treat tonsillitis is with anti-inflammatory drugs such as ibuprofen, or if bacterial in origin, antibiotics, e.g. amoxicillin and azithromycin. Surgical removal (tonsillectomy) may be advised if the tonsils obstruct the airway or interfere with swallowing, or in patients with severe or recurrent tonsillitis. However, different mechanisms of pathogenesis for these two subtypes of tonsillar hypertrophy have been described, and may have different responses to identical therapeutic efforts. In older patients, asymmetric tonsils (also known as asymmetric tonsil hypertrophy) may be an indicator of virally infected tonsils, or tumors such as lymphoma or squamous cell carcinoma.

A tonsillolith (also known as a "tonsil stone") is material that accumulates on the palatine tonsil. This can reach the size of a blueberry and is white or cream in color. The main substance is mostly calcium, but it has a strong unpleasant odor because of hydrogen sulfide, methyl mercaptan, and other chemicals.

Palatine tonsil enlargement can affect speech, making it hypernasal and giving it the sound of velopharyngeal incompetence (when space in the mouth is not fully separated from the nose's air space). Tonsil size may have a more significant impact on upper airway obstruction for obese children than for those of average weight.

As mucosal lymphatic tissue of the aerodigestive tract, the palatine tonsils are viewed in some classifications as belonging to both the gut-associated lymphoid tissue (GALT) and the mucosa-associated lymphoid tissue (MALT). Other viewpoints treat them (and the spleen and thymus) as large lymphatic organs contradistinguished from the smaller tissue loci of GALT and MALT.

== Additional images ==
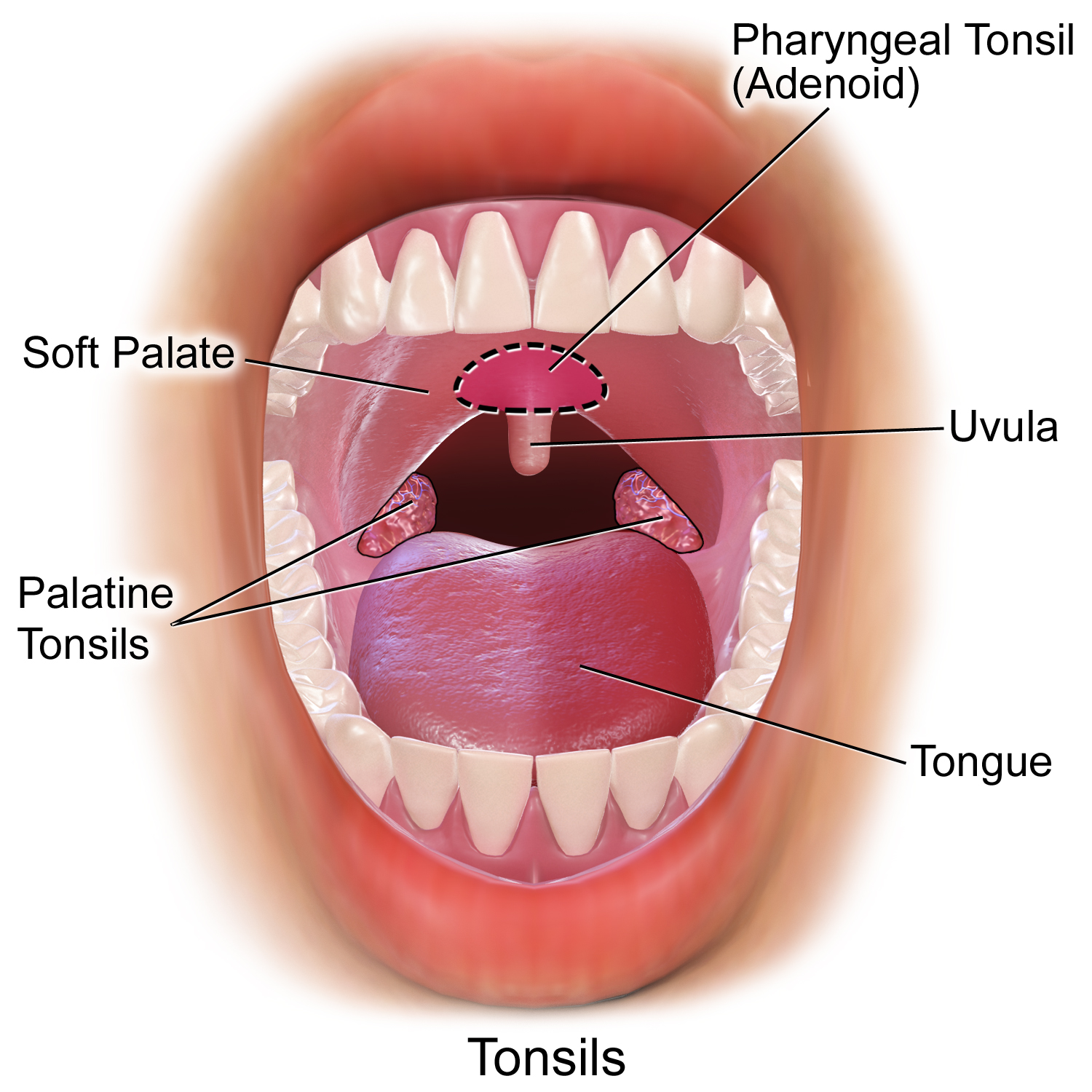
Illustration of frontal view of tonsils
