= Tooth brushing =

Act of cleaning teeth with a toothbrush

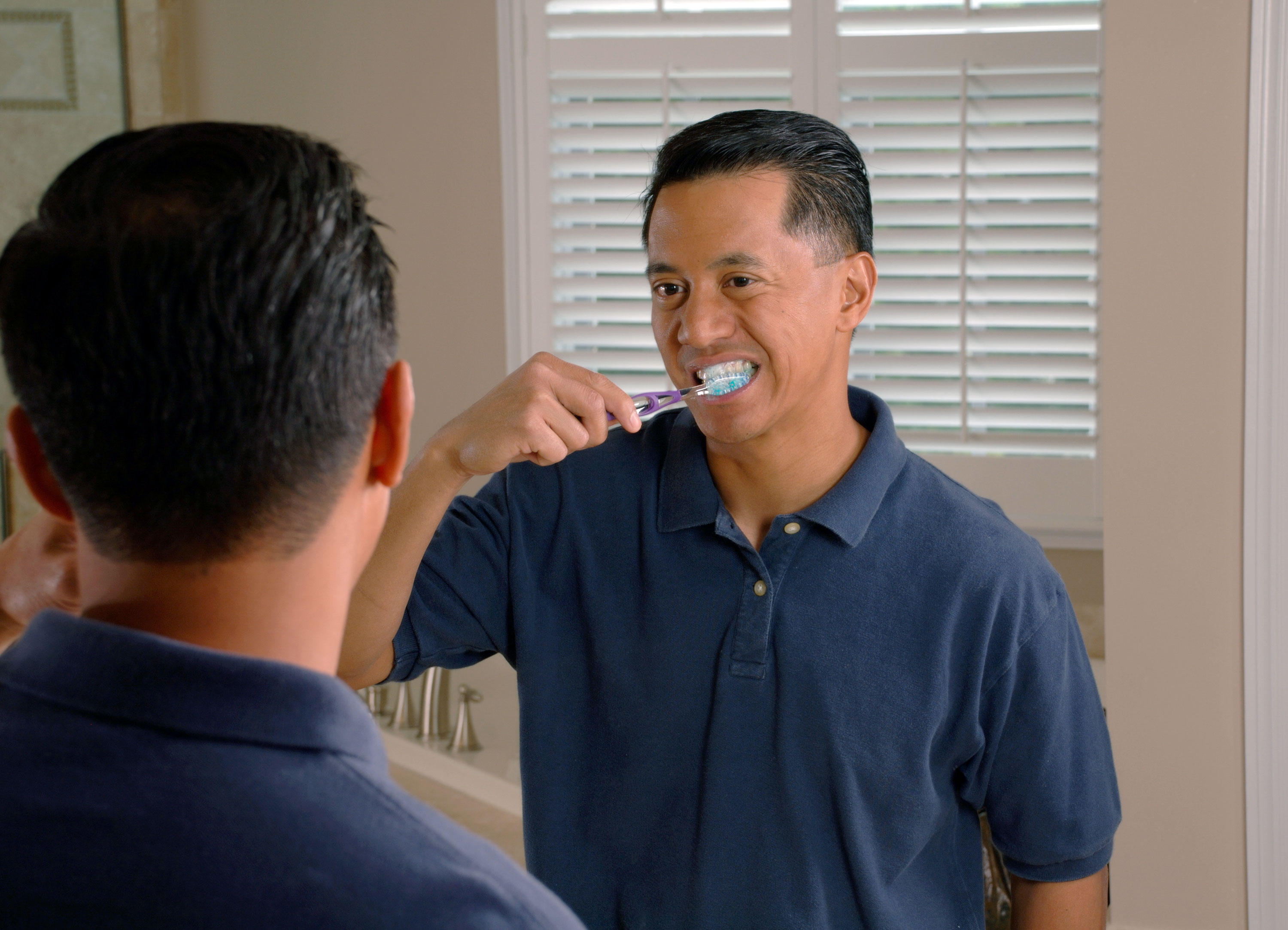
A man brushing his teeth while looking at a mirror.

Tooth brushing is the act of cleaning (by sweeping as opposed to scrubbing) teeth in a motion with a toothbrush equipped with toothpaste. Interdental cleaning (with floss or an interdental brush) can be useful with tooth brushing, and together these two activities are the primary means of cleaning teeth, one of the main aspects of oral hygiene. The American Dental Association recommends brushing twice a day for two minutes each time.

== History ==
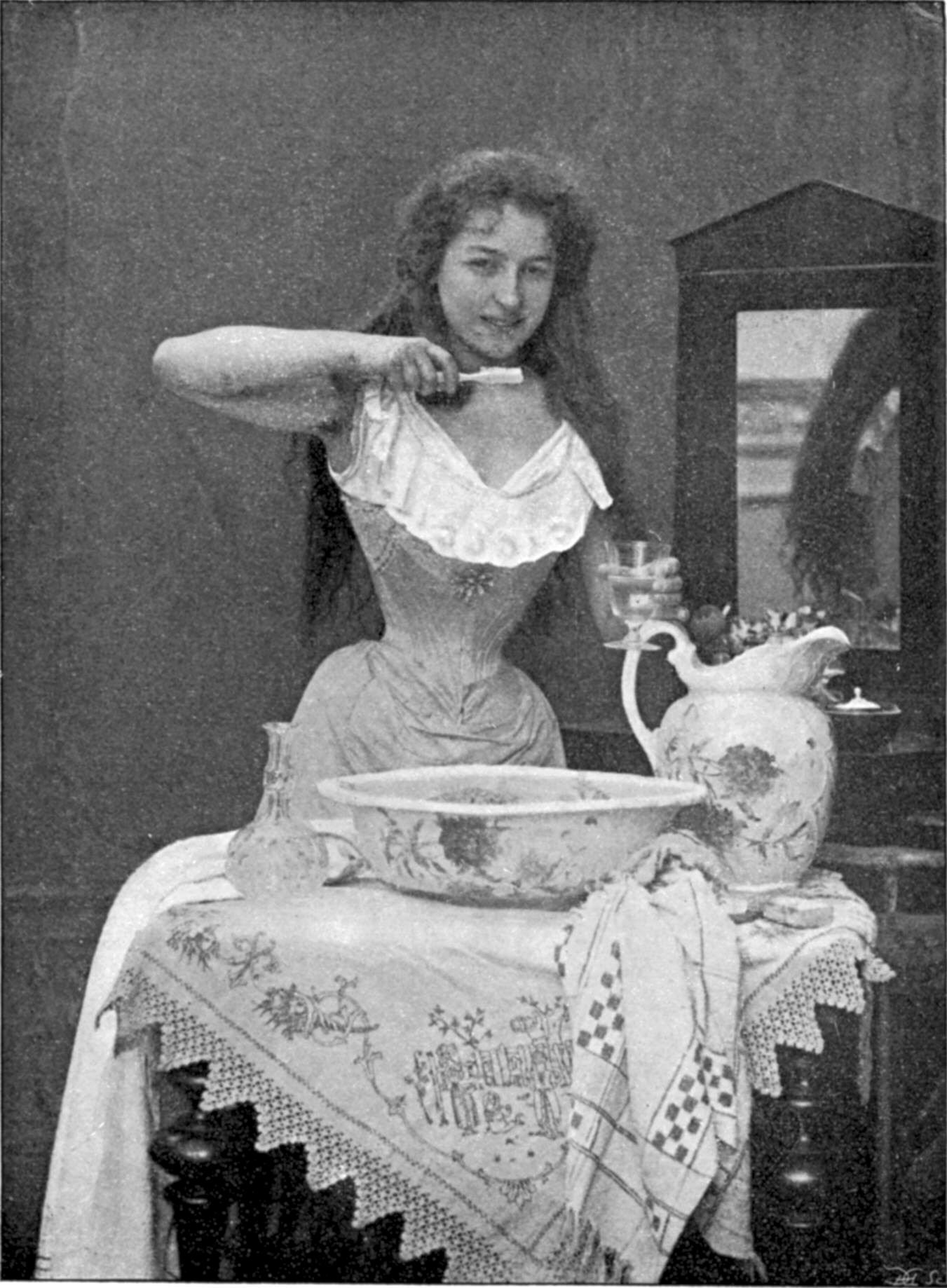
A photo from 1899 showing the use of a toothbrush.

Teeth-cleaning twigs have long been used throughout human history. As long ago as 3000 BC, the ancient Egyptians constructed crude toothbrushes from twigs and leaves to clean their teeth. Similarly, other cultures such as the Greeks, Romans, Arabs and Indians also cleaned their teeth with twigs. Some would fray one end of the twig so that it could penetrate between the teeth more effectively.

In the Islamic prophetic tradition, the Prophet Muhammad taught his disciples to brush their teeth using miswak five times per day, and this remains prevalent amongst many Muslims worldwide since 610 AD.

The Indian method of using wood for brushing was presented by the Chinese Monk Yijing (635–713 AD) when he described the rules for monks in his book:

Every day in the morning, a monk must chew a piece of tooth wood to brush his teeth and scrape his tongue, and this must be done in the proper way. Only after one has washed one's hands and mouth may one make salutations. Otherwise both the saluter and the saluted are at fault.
In Sanskrit, the tooth wood is known as the dantakastha—danta meaning tooth, and kastha, a piece of wood. It is twelve finger-widths in length. The shortest is not less than eight finger-widths long, resembling the little finger in size. Chew one end of the wood well for a long while and then brush the teeth with it.

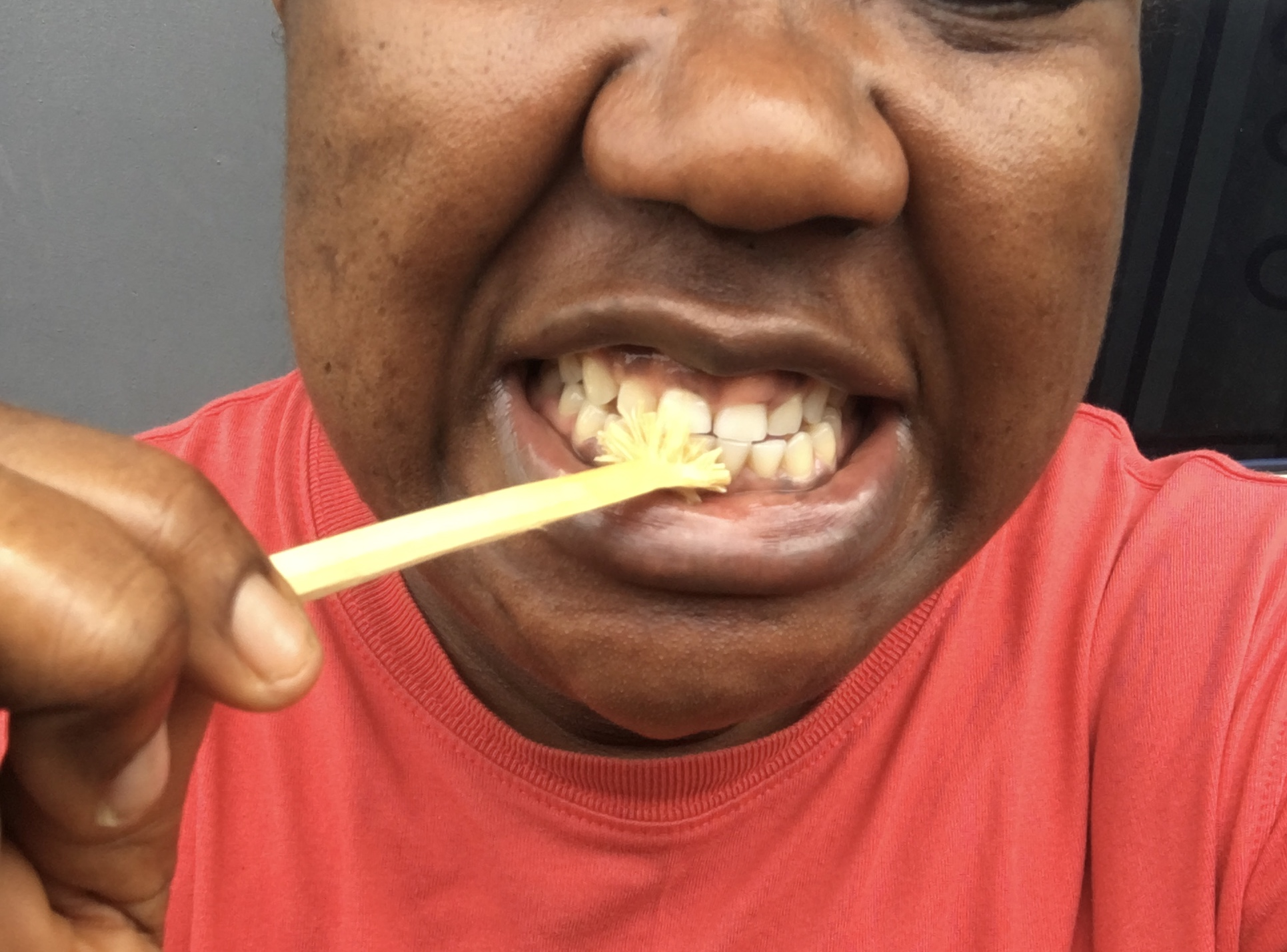
Brushing teeth with chewing stick

Modern-day tooth brushing as a regular habit became prevalent in Europe from the end of the 17th century. The first mass-produced toothbrush was developed in England in 1780 by William Addis. In the United States, although toothbrushes were available at the end of the 19th century, the practice did not become widespread until after the Second World War, when US soldiers continued the tooth brushing that had been required during their military service.

== Reasons ==
Brushing teeth properly helps prevent cavities, and gum disease, which causes at least one-third of adult tooth loss. If teeth are not brushed correctly and frequently, it could lead to the calcification of saliva minerals, forming tartar. Tartar hardens (then referred to as 'calculus') if not removed every 48 hours. Poor dental health has been associated with heart disease and shortened life expectancy.

Many serious problems result from not maintaining proper oral hygiene. Not brushing teeth causes harmful bacteria to build up on teeth and gums. Bacteria growing in the mouth can infect the gums and then can travel into blood vessels. When gingivitis and periodontitis bacteria move into the blood vessels, it can cause inflammation and damaged vessels. It clogs blood vessels, making it hard for blood to flow and can lead to blood clots, heart attacks, and strokes. Although the study at Harvard Medical School has observed "remnants of oral bacteria within atherosclerotic blood vessels far from the mouth", there are other factors including gender, alcohol consumption, diabetes, exercise, smoking, and family history of heart problems that could increase the risk of coronary artery disease as well. These factors make it hard to judge how much not brushing one's teeth elevates the risk of coronary heart disease, but there is a proven correlation between poor oral health and coronary heart disease. The negative effects of not brushing teeth can be observed progressively, from plaque buildup and bad breath within a day, to gum disease and tooth loss after prolonged neglect.

Another negative side effect of not brushing one's teeth is halitosis or bad breath. According to the American Dental Association, not brushing properly allows remnants of food to collect on the teeth, gum line, and the surface of the tongue. Tooth plaque leads to gingivitis and periodontitis bacteria build-up, which produces bad-smelling odors. Having bad breath is very common, and most people experience it, but not brushing one's teeth particularly increases the risk. The ADA states that properly brushing teeth to remove bacteria that contribute to oral odors will improve oral hygiene and keep breath smelling as fresh as possible.

== Tooth-brushing guidelines ==
=== Frequency ===
A 2008 review cites studies from 1969–1973 that gum and tooth health were maintained if brushing removed dental plaque more often than every 48 hours, and gum inflammation happened if brushing happened at intervals longer than 48 hours. The 2008 review noted that tooth brushing can remove plaque up to one millimeter below the gum line, and that each person has a habitual brushing method, so more frequent brushing does not cover additional parts of the teeth or mouth.

Dentists consider the extra abrasion of dentin from brushing multiple times per day to be insignificant, since modern toothpastes have relative dentin abrasivity below 250. A 1997 study simulated six months of brushing with manual or sonic toothbrushes. Neither caused observable wear of tooth surface or fillings. Both caused a small loss of cement at the edge of gold inlays. A 2017 study put composite fillings on both sides of extracted teeth. The study simulated seven years of brushing one side of each tooth with a sonic toothbrush, then measured microleakage around the fillings. No leakage was found at any bond between filling and enamel. At bonds between filling and cementum, there was sometimes leakage, and it happened to the same extent on the brushed sides of teeth and the unbrushed sides.

When asked to brush "to the best of their abilities", young adults brushed longer, but did not cover any additional parts of their mouths. They brushed especially long on the grinding surfaces of back teeth (occlusal), which are the prime location for cavities in young children, but not in adults, where sides are more prone to cavities.

A 2005 review of dental studies found consensus that a thorough tooth brushing once a day is sufficient for maintaining oral health, and that most dentists recommended patients brush twice a day in the hope that more frequent brushing would clean more areas of the mouth.

A 2018 review noted that tooth brushing is the most common preventive healthcare activity, but tooth and gum disease remain high, since lay people clean at most 40% of their tooth margins at the gum line. Videos show that even when asked to brush their best, they do not know how to clean effectively. Another 2018 study found that dental professionals did clean their teeth effectively.

=== Contamination ===
A 2012 literature review found that bacteria survive on toothbrushes over 24 hours in moist conditions, less so when air-dried, though they can pick up contamination from the surrounding environment. Brushes can be decontaminated by soaking for 20 minutes in mouthwash. Harmful bacteria are present on brushes of healthy and sick people, and can add to their infectious load.

Mouthwashes themselves reduce plaque by an average of 35% if they contain essential oils or chlorhexidine gluconate. The research does not report the extent of simultaneous tooth brushing by participants in mouthwash studies. Side effects of mouthwashes with essential oils and alcohol include poor taste and oral irritation. Side effects of those with chlorhexidine gluconate include tooth stains, calculus, taste disturbance and effects on the mouth lining.

=== Techniques ===
Rinsing a toothbrush

Gargle clean, fresh water a couple of times and rinse the toothbrush with water. Standard advice is that the front and backs of teeth should be brushed with the toothbrush at a 45-degree angle towards the gum line, moving the brush in a back-and-forth rolling motion that makes contact with the gum line and tooth. To brush the backs of the front teeth, the brush should be held vertically to the tooth and moved in an up-and-down motion. The chewing surfaces of the teeth are brushed with a forward and back motion, with the toothbrush pointing straight at the tooth.

Specialized advice for OralB rotating electric brushes is to follow the shape of each tooth and the gums, holding the brush against each tooth surface one at a time, for 1–2 seconds per tooth. Advice for Sonicare brushes is to use a slight angle, so longer bristles can reach between the teeth, making 3–5 small circles for 1–2 seconds on each tooth. Bristles conform to tooth shapes.

There are several other techniques:

- Sweep: simplest technique; toothbrush is held parallel to the gum line and horizontal movements are made to "sweep" the gum crevice (as opposed to aggressively scrubbing), chewing surfaces, and surfaces close to the tongue. Associated with gingival recession.
- Fones (Fones Rotary): oldest toothbrushing technique, mainly recommended for children. Involves a circular motion over the surfaces of the teeth
- Hirschfeld: modification of Fones technique, circular motion is smaller and concentrated over the gum crevice line
- Bass: emphasizes cleaning of area above and below gum line with horizontal brush movements
- Modified Bass: derived from the Bass technique, it adds a coronal rolling (sweeping) motion toward the biting edge while retaining the original Bass vibratory movements.
- Stillman: similar to Bass technique, but instead uses vertical motions to clean above and below gum line, may be combined with the Bass technique
- Charters: the toothbrush head is placed at the gumline and is angled at a 45-degree angle toward the biting surface and short vibrations are applied with slight rotating movements

As far as technique recommendations, the simpler Scrub and Fones techniques are recommended for use by children as they are likely easier to master than the more complex techniques. For adults, the more complex Bass and Modified Bass techniques are recommended. However, brushing techniques learned in childhood often carry over into adulthood and it is then difficult for adults to change these learned behaviours. More complex techniques are not necessarily more effective. While there are many different tooth brushing techniques, there is no evidence that any of them is superior to the others.

=== Tooth brushing before meals ===
One study found that brushing immediately after an acidic meal (such as diet soda or common breakfast foods like orange juice, coffee, citrus fruit, dried fruit, bread, or pastries) caused more damage to enamel and dentin compared to waiting 30 minutes. Flushing the acid away with water or dissolved baking soda could help reduce acid damage exacerbated by brushing. The same response was recommended for acid reflux and other acidic meals. Researchers and dentists have concluded that brushing immediately after consuming acidic beverages should be avoided. It is better to brush before breakfast or dinner.

In addition, brushing before breakfast eliminates overnight bacteria buildup, preventing them from thriving on sugary breakfast foods and producing enamel-damaging acids, while stimulating saliva production to neutralize acidity and reinforce teeth with essential minerals. This practice secures dental hygiene within the morning routine, crucial for avoiding neglect due to the morning rush, particularly for families with children or those eating breakfast outside the home.

== Toothbrush ==
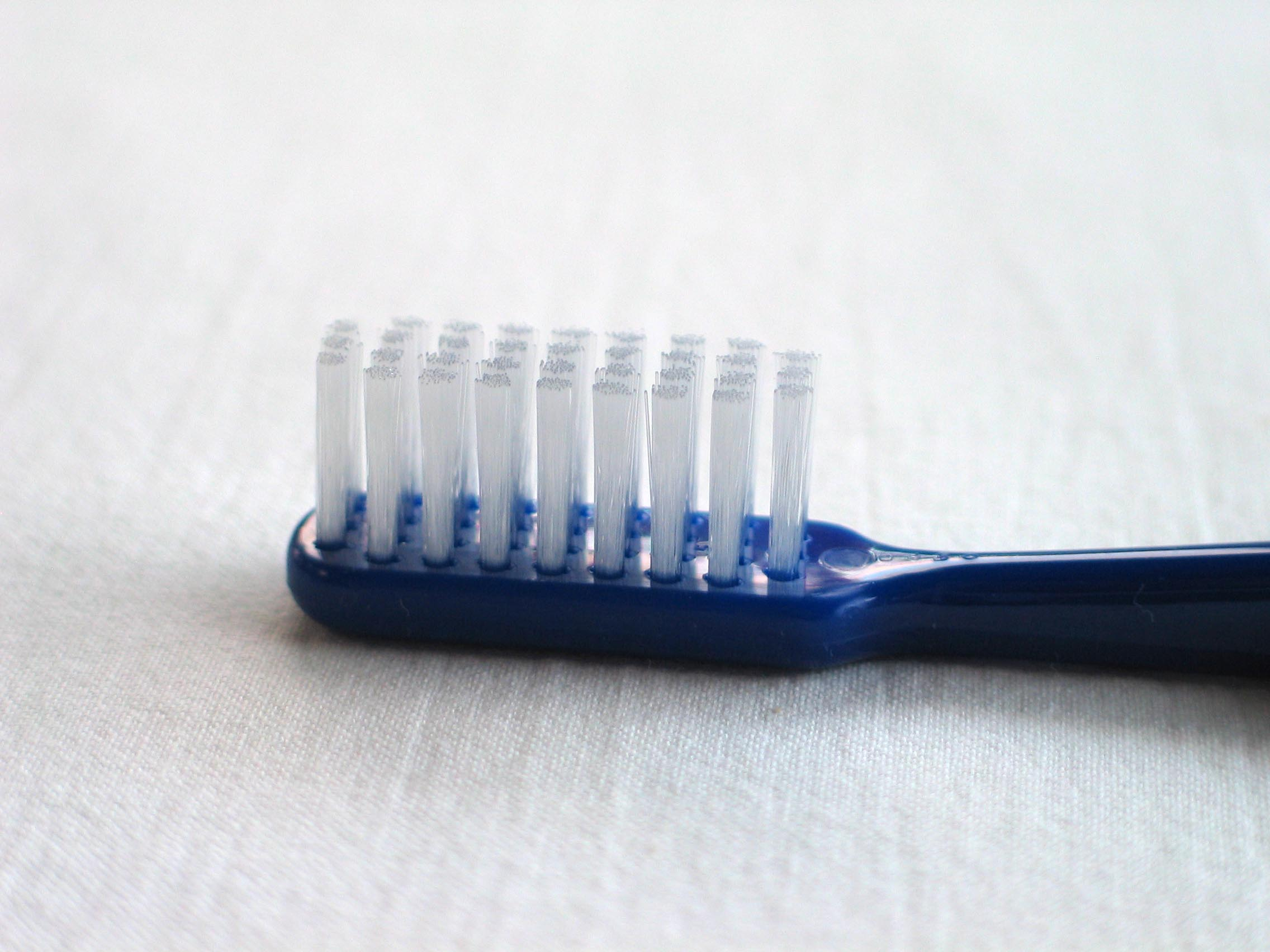
Head of a toothbrush

A toothbrush is an instrument used to clean teeth, consisting of a small brush on a handle. Toothpaste, often containing fluoride, is commonly added to a toothbrush to aid in cleaning. Toothbrushes come in manual and electric varieties. Although there is conflicting evidence as to which is more effective, most evidence points to electric toothbrushes with an oscillatory motion being more effective than manual toothbrushes, with toothbrushes lacking an oscillatory motion being equivalent. A 2014 Cochrane review found moderate evidence that electric toothbrushes reduce plaque and gingivitis more than manual ones. Overall, both manual and electric toothbrushes are effective, however, and it is often recommended that people use whichever they feel comfortable with, determine is affordable for them, and will be more likely to regularly brush with.

== Toothpaste ==
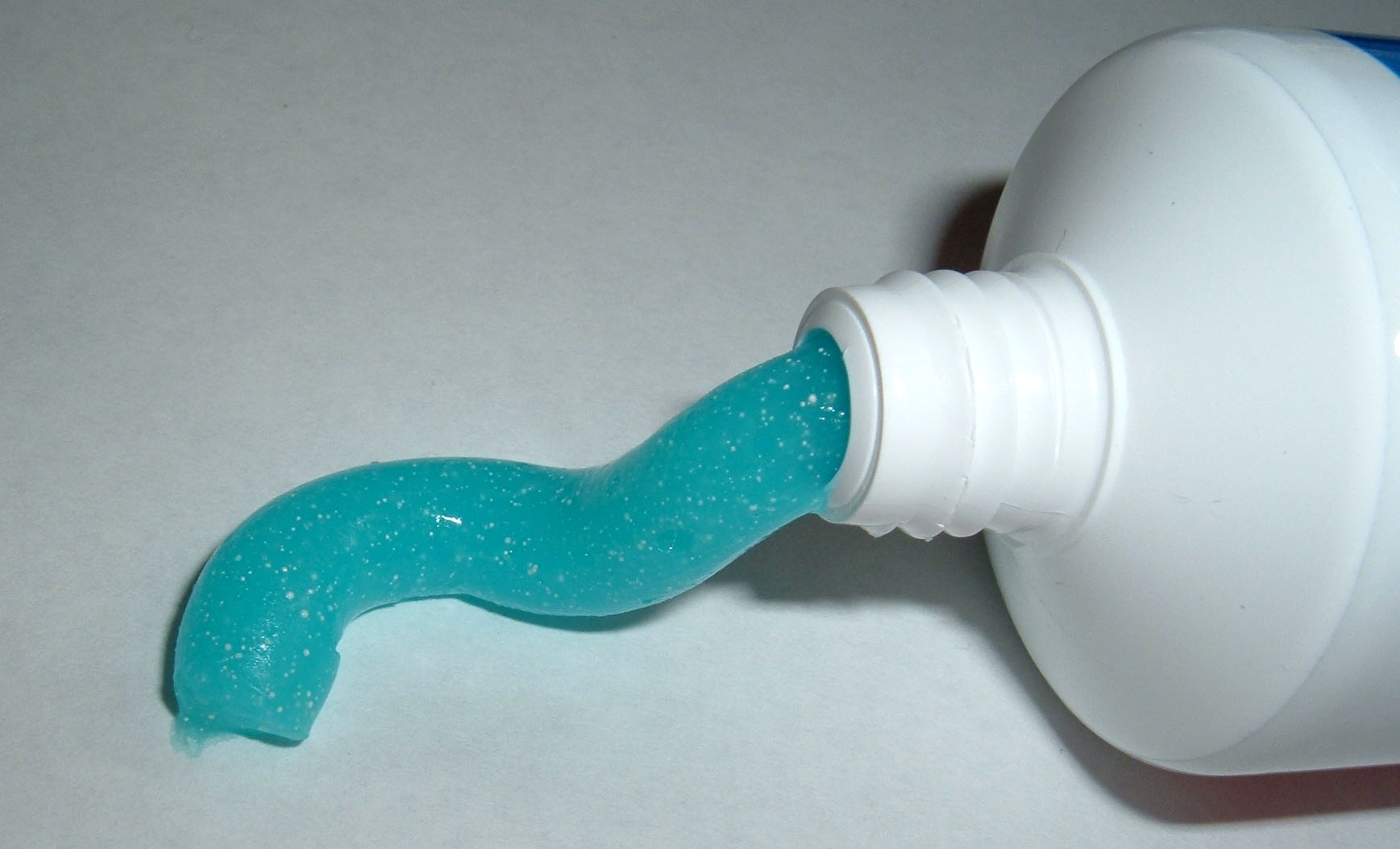
Modern toothpaste gel

Toothpaste is a paste or gel dentifrice used to clean and improve the aesthetic appearance and health of teeth. It is almost always used in conjunction with a toothbrush. Toothpaste use can promote good oral hygiene: it can aid in the removal of dental plaque and food from the teeth, it can aid in the elimination and/or masking of halitosis when tonsil stones are not the cause, and it can deliver active ingredients such as fluoride to prevent tooth and gum (gingiva) disease.

There is evidence that the addition of xylitol to fluoride-containing toothpastes reduces incidence of tooth decay by about 13%.

=== Tooth powder ===
Tooth powder (or 'toothpaste powder') is an alternative to toothpaste. It may be recommended for people with sensitive teeth. Tooth powder typically does not contain the chemical sodium lauryl sulphate, commonly used in toothpaste, which can be a skin irritant. The function of sodium lauryl sulphate is to form suds when teeth are brushed. Those with dentures may also use denture cleaner which can also come in powder form.

=== Fluoride toothpaste use in young children ===
When brushing teeth, using toothpaste that contains fluoride is recommended. There are different recommendations for the amount of toothpaste used based on age:

- For children under 3 years of age: use a small smear or rice grain amount of fluoridated toothpaste if the child is at high risk for cavities.
- For children 3 to 6 years old: use no more than a pea-sized amount of fluoridated toothpaste

Toothbrushing should begin as soon as teeth begin to erupt into the mouth and should be done twice daily (morning and night). It is very important that caregivers supervise children's brushing to minimize swallowing of toothpaste. (ADA) For children at high risk of developing cavities, a dietary fluoride supplement (ADA) or professionally-applied fluoride varnish can be considered. Fluoride is a safe and effective way to prevent and control cavities.

== See also ==
- Teeth cleaning
