= BANA test =

The BANA test (referring to the enzymatic breakdown of N-benzoyl-dl-arginine-2-napthylamide) is used to determine the proteolytic activity of certain oral anaerobes that contribute to oral malodor. Some bacteria, e.g. Prophyromona gingivalis, Treponema denticola, and Bacteroides forsythus (Red complex) produce waste products that are quite odiferous, and as a result contribute to bad breath.

When a sample of a patient's saliva that contains these bacteria is placed within the BANA testing compound, it causes the breakdown of the N-benzoyl enzyme. As a result of this biodegradation occurs, the test compound changes color, indicating a positive reaction.

Uses: Used to identify volatile Sulphur compounds in halitosis patients.
