= Tonsillar crypts =

Deep indentations in human tonsils

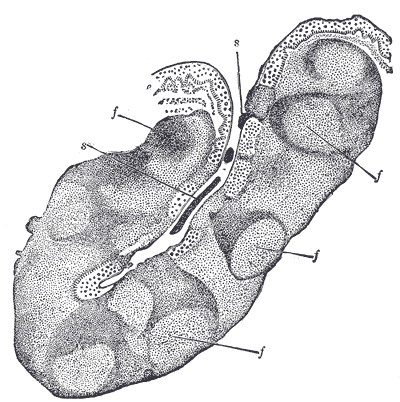
- Low-power microscope magnification of a cross-section through one of the tonsillar crypts (running diagonally) as it opens onto the surface of the throat (at the top). Stratified epithelium (e) covers the throat's surface and continues as a lining of the crypt. Beneath the surface are numerous nodules (f) of lymphoid tissue. Many lymph cells (dark-colored region) pass from the nodules toward the surface and will eventually mix with the saliva as salivary corpuscles (s).

Details

Identifiers
- Latin: cryptae tonsillares
- TA98: A05.2.01.015; A13.2.02.002; A13.2.02.003; A05.3.01.008
- TA2: 5180, 5190
- FMA: 76579

The human palatine tonsils (PT) are covered by stratified squamous epithelium that extends into deep and partly branched tonsillar crypts, of which there are about 10 to 30. The crypts greatly increase the contact surface between environmental influences and lymphoid tissue. In an average adult palatine tonsil the estimated epithelial surface area of the crypts is 295 cm^{2}, in addition to the 45 cm^{2} of epithelium covering the oropharyngeal surface.

The crypts extend through the full thickness of the tonsil reaching almost to its hemicapsule. In healthy tonsils the openings of the crypts are fissure-like, and the walls of the lumina are in apposition. A computerized three-dimensional reconstruction of the palatine tonsil crypt system showed that in the centre of the palatine tonsil are tightly packed ramified crypts that join with each other, while on the periphery there is a rather simple and sparse arrangement.

The crypt system is not merely a group of invaginations of the tonsillar epithelium but a highly complicated network of canals with special types of epithelium and with various structures surrounding the canals, such as blood and lymphatic vessels and germinal centers. The largest and deepest of the crypts is the crypta magna located near to the upper pole near the soft palate. The crypto magna represents the remains of the second pharyngeal pouch.

Macrophages and other white blood cells concentrate by the tonsillar crypts as well, in response to the microorganisms attracted to the crypts. Accordingly, the tonsillar crypts serve a forward sentry role for the immune system, by providing early exposure of immune system cells to infectious organisms which may be introduced into the body via food or other ingested matter.

However, the tonsillar crypts often provide such an inviting environment to bacteria that bacterial colonies may form solidified "plugs" or "stones" within the crypts. In particular, sufferers of chronic sinusitis or post-nasal drip frequently suffer from these overgrowths of bacteria in the tonsillar crypts. These small whitish plugs, termed "tonsilloliths" and sometimes known as "tonsil stones," have a foul smell and can contribute to bad breath; furthermore, they can obstruct the normal flow of pus from the crypts, and may irritate the throat (people with tonsil stones may complain of the feeling that something is stuck in their throat).

Lingual tonsils in humans also have long crypts but, unlike the crypts in the palatine tonsils, they are unbranched.

The small folds in adenoids are sometimes described as crypts.
