= Throat =

Anterior part of the neck, in front of the vertebra

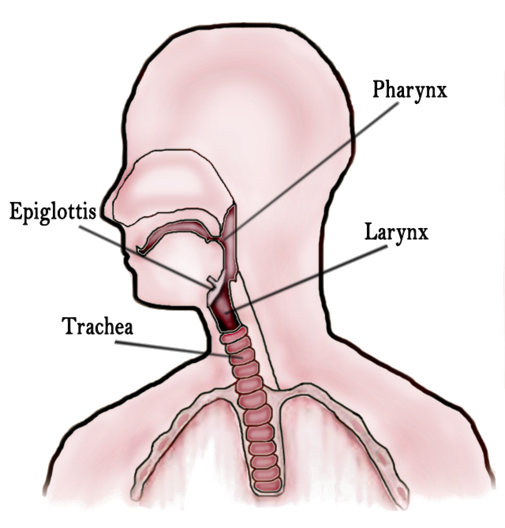
- The human throat

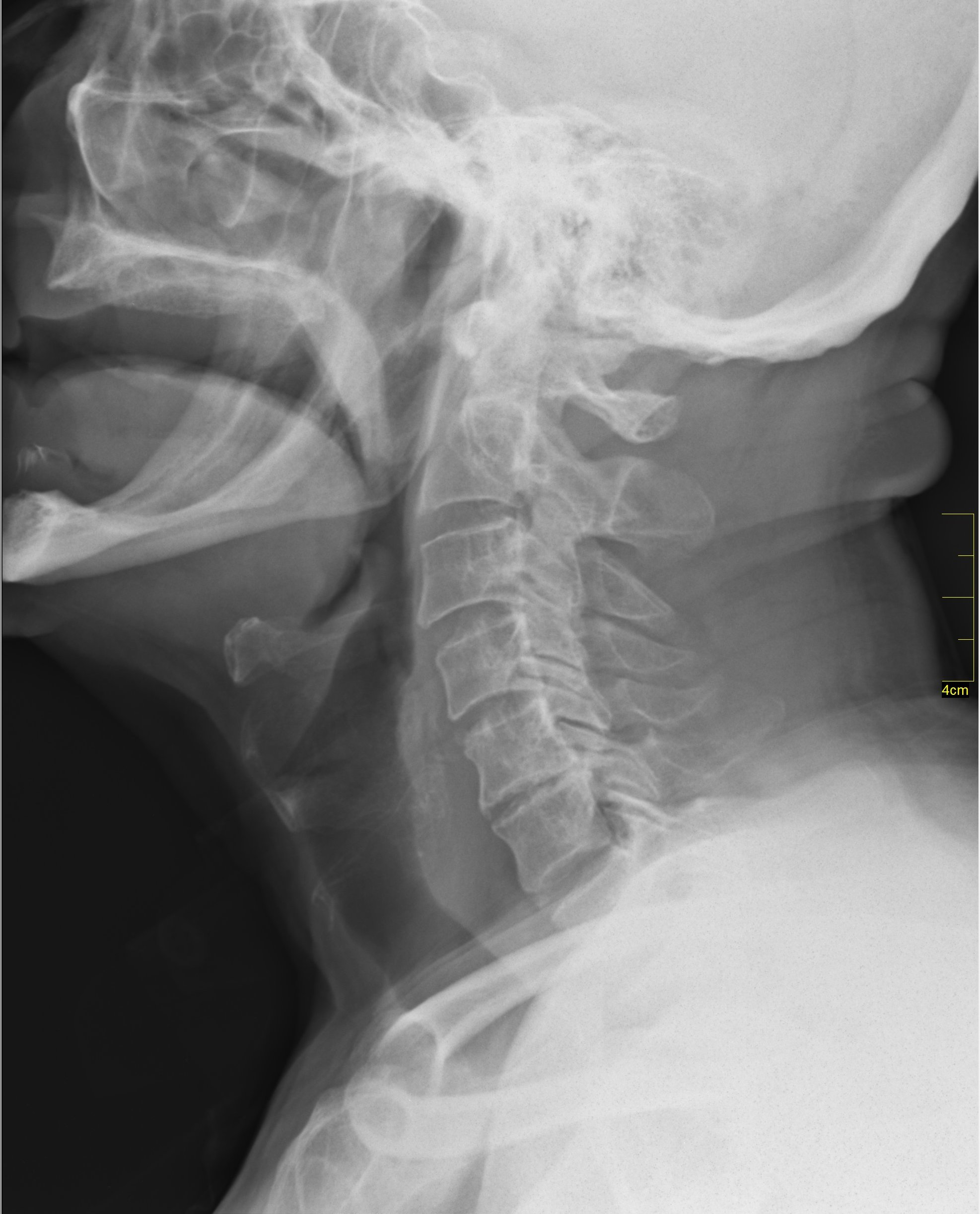
- X-ray showing the throat, seen as a dark band to the front of the spine

Details

Identifiers
- Latin: gula jugulum
- FMA: 228738

In vertebrate anatomy, the throat is the front part of the neck, internally positioned in front of the vertebrae. It contains the pharynx and larynx. An important section of it is the epiglottis, separating the esophagus from the trachea (windpipe), preventing food and drinks being inhaled into the lungs. The throat contains various blood vessels, pharyngeal muscles, the nasopharyngeal tonsil, the tonsils, the palatine uvula, the trachea, the esophagus, and the vocal cords. Mammal throats consist of two bones, the hyoid bone and the clavicle. The "throat" is sometimes thought to be synonymous for the fauces.

It works with the mouth, ears and nose, as well as a number of other parts of the body. Its pharynx is connected to the mouth, allowing speech to occur, and food and liquid to pass down the throat. It is joined to the nose by the nasopharynx at the top of the throat, and to the ear by its Eustachian tube. The throat's trachea carries inhaled air to the bronchi of the lungs. The esophagus carries food through the throat to the stomach. Adenoids and tonsils help prevent infection and are composed of lymph tissue. The larynx contains vocal cords, the epiglottis (preventing food/liquid inhalation), and an area known as the subglottic larynx, in children it is the narrowest section of the upper part of the throat.

The jugulum is a low part of the throat, located slightly above the breast. The term jugulum is reflected both by the internal and external jugular veins, which pass through the jugulum.

== See also ==
- Strep throat
- Tonsilloliths
- Tracheotomy
