= Amine fluoride =

Dental drugs

Amine fluorides are dental drugs.

== History ==
Amine fluorides were developed in the 1950s by GABA in collaboration with the Institute of Dentistry of the University of Zurich (Switzerland).

For the first time, in 1954, Wainwright showed in his study the high permeability of tooth enamel to organic molecules like urea. This aspect made him ask himself if it was not possible to enrich the contents of the enamel with fluoride by using organic molecules as carrier, which were chemically bonded to amino fluoride.

In 1957, Mühlemann, Schmid and König published the results of their studies in vitro, in which they demonstrated that some compounds with amino fluoride were obviously superior to those with inorganic fluoride in reducing the solubility of the enamel.

In the same year, Irwin, Leaver and Walsh published the results of their experiments in vitro, which demonstrated that monoamine-aliphatic compounds offered protection to the enamel against acid decalcification.

In 1967, Muhleman demonstrated the superiority of organic fluoride compared to inorganic fluoride in preventing dental decay. He observed that amine fluoride had a pronounced affinity regarding enamel, by raising the quantity of fluoride in the enamel and also having an antienzyme effect on the microbial activity of dental plaque. His conclusions were the following:

- Amino fluorides produce the most powerful enrichment in fluoride of the enamel, even in low concentration.
- The carious preventive action is due to fluoride on one side and to the anti-enzyme effect of the organic fraction on the other side and
- Also by arresting the formation of dental plaque, as a result of the tensioactive properties.

In this way amine fluorides were born in GABA S.A.-BASEL laboratory.

The commercial products, which contain amine fluoride or compounds of this with tin-fluoride in their formula, are present under different forms: - gels, - fluids, - dentifrice, - mouth rinse.

== Structure ==
The unique position of the amine fluoride is based on their special molecular structure: the fluoride ion is bound to an organic fatty acid amine fragment. This is not the case for the inorganics fluorides such as sodium fluoride and sodium monofluorophosphate.

Amine fluorides have a hydrophobic molecular moiety, the non-polar tail, with a hydrophilic component, the polar amine head. For this reason, they act like surfactants, reducing the surface tension of saliva, and forming a homogeneous film on all oral surfaces.

Due to their surface activity the amine fluorides are rapidly dispersed in the oral cavity and wet all surfaces. In contrast, in the case of inorganic fluorides the counter ion (e.g. sodium) has no transport function; the fluoride is statistically distributed in the oral cavity. Amine fluoride covers the tooth surfaces with a homogeneous molecular layer. This continuous film prevents rapid rinsing off by the saliva. The amine fluorides are thus available as an active agent for a longer period.

Amine fluorides have a slightly acidic pH. For this reason, fluoride ions can combine rapidly with the calcium in dental enamel to form calcium fluoride. This acts as a fluoride depot over a longer period: Under cariogenic conditions fluoride ions are made available stimulating the remineralisation of dental enamel and thus prevent acid attacks.

== See also ==
- Silver diammine fluoride
- Olaflur
