= Tubal tonsil =

Tonsil by the Eustachian tube

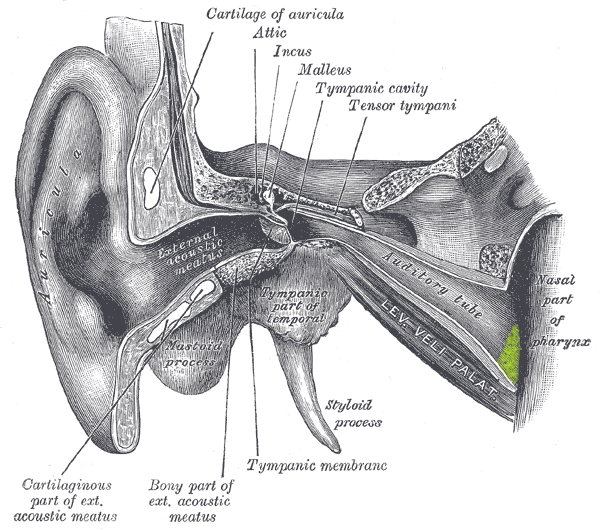
- External and middle ear, opened from the front. Right side. (Tubal tonsil (highlighted).)

Details
- System: Lymphatic system

Identifiers
- Latin: tonsilla tubaria
- TA98: A05.3.01.016
- TA2: 5189
- FMA: 54975

The tubal tonsil, also known as Gerlach tonsil, is one of the four main tonsil groups forming Waldeyer's tonsillar ring.

== Structure ==
Each tubal tonsil is located posterior to the opening of the Eustachian tube on the lateral wall of the nasopharynx. It is one of the four main tonsil groups forming Waldeyer's tonsillar ring. This ring also includes the palatine tonsils, the lingual tonsils, and the adenoid.

== Clinical significance ==
The tubal tonsil may be affected by tonsillitis. However, this usually affects only the palatine tonsils.

== History ==
The tubal tonsil may also be known as the Gerlach tonsil. It is very close to the torus tubarius, which is why this tonsil is sometimes also called the tonsil of (the) torus tubarius. Equating the torus with its tonsil however might be seen as incorrect or imprecise.
