= Cetylpyridinium chloride =

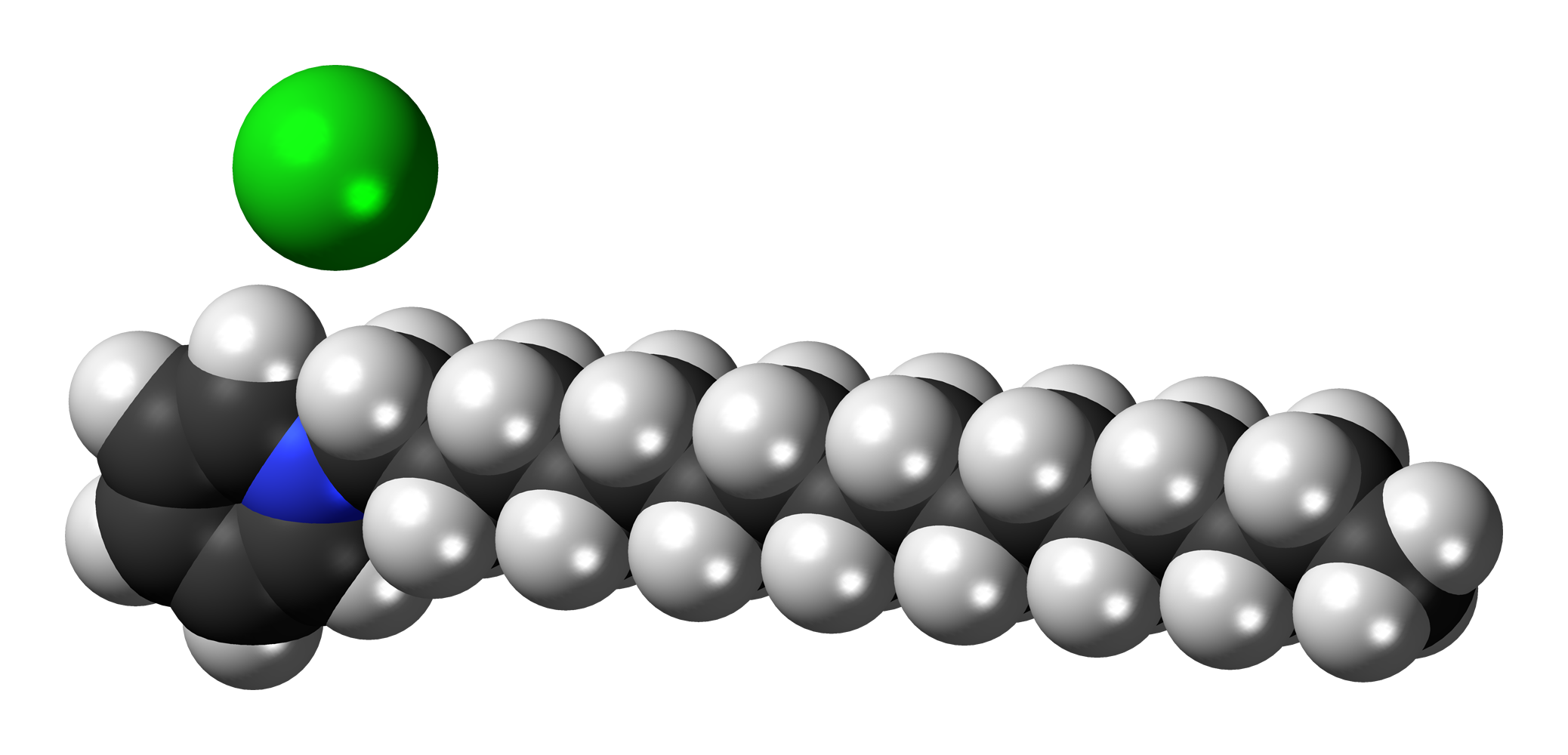

Names
- Preferred IUPAC name 1-Hexadecylpyridin-1-ium chloride
- Other names Acetoquat CPC; Pyrisept EXADECYL-PYRIDINIUM, CHLORIDE

Identifiers
CAS Number	123-03-5; 6004-24-6 (monohydrate) D08AJ03 (WHO), D09AA07 (WHO) (dressing), R02AA06 (WHO)
3D model (JSmol)	Interactive image
Beilstein Reference	3578606
ChEBI	CHEBI:32915
ChEMBL	ChEMBL34833
ChemSpider	28979
ECHA InfoCard	100.004.177
PubChem CID	31239
UNII	6BR7T22E2S; D9OM4SK49P (monohydrate)
CompTox Dashboard (EPA)	DTXSID6041761
- InChI: InChI=1S/C21H38N.ClH/c1-2-3-4-5-6-7-8-9-10-11-12-13-14-16-19-22-20-17-15-18-21-22;/h15,17-18,20-21H,2-14,16,19H2,1H3;1H/q+1;/p-1 Key: YMKDRGPMQRFJGP-UHFFFAOYSA-M; InChI=1/C21H38N.ClH/c1-2-3-4-5-6-7-8-9-10-11-12-13-14-16-19-22-20-17-15-18-21-22;/h15,17-18,20-21H,2-14,16,19H2,1H3;1H/q+1;/p-1 Key: YMKDRGPMQRFJGP-REWHXWOFAU
- SMILES: [Cl-].[n+]1(ccccc1)CCCCCCCCCCCCCCCC

Properties
Chemical formula	C_{21}H_{38}ClN
Molar mass	339.99 g·mol^{−1}
Appearance	Solid
Melting point	77 °C (171 °F; 350 K)

Pharmacology
ATC code	R02AA06 (WHO) B05CA01 (WHO)

Hazards
- Lethal dose or concentration (LD, LC)
LD_{50} (median dose)	36 mg/kg (rabbit, iv); 400 mg/kg (rabbit, oral); 6 mg/kg (rat, ip); 30 mg/kg (rat, iv); 200 mg/kg (rat, oral); 250 mg/kg (rat, sc); 10 mg/kg (mouse, ip); 108 mg/kg (mouse, oral)<LC50 0.09mg/l (rat, inhalation)
- Except where otherwise noted, data are given for materials in their standard state (at 25 °C [77 °F], 100 kPa). verify (what is ?) Infobox references

Cetylpyridinium chloride (CPC) is a cationic quaternary ammonium used in some types of mouthwashes, toothpastes, lozenges, throat sprays, breath sprays, and nasal sprays. It is an antiseptic that kills bacteria and other microorganisms. It has been shown to be effective in preventing dental plaque and reducing gingivitis. It has also been used as an ingredient in certain pesticides. Though one study seems to indicate cetylpyridinium chloride does not cause brown tooth stains, at least one mouthwash containing CPC as an active ingredient bears the warning label "In some cases, antimicrobial rinses may cause surface staining to teeth," following a failed class-action lawsuit brought by customers whose teeth were stained.

The name breaks down as:

1. cetyl- refers to the cetyl group, named for its relation to cetyl alcohol, which was first isolated from whale oil (Latin: cetus);
2. pyridinium refers to the cation [C_{5}H_{5}NH]^{+}, the conjugate acid of pyridine;
3. chloride refers to the anion Cl^{−}.

== Medical use ==
Over-the-counter (OTC) products containing cetylpyridinium chloride include oral wash, oral rinse, and ingestable products, such as lozenges and over-the-counter cough syrup.

The United States' federal Food and Drug Administration's monograph on oral antiseptic drug products reviewed the data regarding CPC and made this conclusion:

The agency believes that the information contained in its adverse reaction files, 30 years of safe marketing of an OTC mouthwash containing cetylpyridinium chloride (NDA 14- 598), and the safety data evaluated by the Oral Cavity Panel are sufficient to conclude that 0.025 to 0.1 percent cetylpyridinium chloride is safe as an OTC oral antiseptic when labeled for short-term use (not to exceed 7 days).

The United States National Library of Medicine Toxicology Data Network (TOXNET) reviewed the range of toxicity of CPC and stated "Significant toxicity is rare after exposure to low concentration products that are typically available in the home."

The fatal dose in humans ingesting cationic detergents has been estimated to be 1 to 3 g. Therefore, a person using a typical oral ingestible product that provides 0.25 mg CPC per dose would need to take 4,000 doses at one time to reach the estimated fatal dose range.

A review found that mouthwashes containing CPC "provide a small but significant additional benefit when compared with toothbrushing only or toothbrushing followed by a placebo rinse" in reducing plaque and gingivitis-inflammation. In combination with chlorhexidine and zinc lactate, CPC has been found to be effective in treating halitosis.

CPC mouthwashes inactivate viruses, including the virus that causes COVID-19, by breaking their lipid envelope.

== Side effects ==
=== Tooth staining ===
Cetylpyridinium chloride is known to cause tooth staining in approximately 3 percent of users. The Crest brand has noted that this staining is actually an indication that the product is working as intended, as the stains are a result of bacteria dying on the teeth. Crest stated that because of the low incidence of staining, there was no need to label Pro-Health mouthwash as a potential tooth stainer. However, after numerous complaints and a federal class-action lawsuit, which was later dismissed, the mouthwash now contains a label warning consumers of its potential to stain teeth.

=== Temporary loss of taste ===
In a small percentage of population, CPC can alter or eliminate the sense of taste. The effect generally goes away a few days after discontinuing use of the product.

== Toxicology and pharmacology ==
The LD_{50} of cetylpyridinium chloride has been measured at 30 mg/kg in rats and 36 mg/kg in rabbits when the chemical is administered by intravenous infusion but 200 mg/kg in rats, 400 mg/kg in rabbits, and 108 mg/kg in mice when administered orally.

There is in-vitro evidence that cetylpyridinium chloride interferes with mitochondrial function at levels "that may be relevant to human exposures." The research was published in Environmental Health Perspectives" volume 125 no. 8.

== Chemistry ==
The molecular formula of cetylpyridinium chloride is C_{21}H_{38}NCl. In its pure form it is a white solid at room temperature. It has a melting point of 77 °C when anhydrous or 80–83 °C as a monohydrate . It is soluble in water but insoluble in acetone, acetic acid, or ethanol. It has a pyridine-like odor. It is combustible. Concentrated solutions are destructive to mucous membranes. Its critical micelle concentration (CMC) is ~ 0.0009–0.0011M, and is strongly dependent on the salt concentration of the solution.

Some products are formulated instead with the bromide salt cetylpyridinium bromide, the properties of which are virtually identical.

== Compendial status ==
- Food Chemicals Codex
- United States Pharmacopeia 31
- British Pharmacopoeia 1998

== See also ==
- Mouthwash
- Oral-B
- Chlorhexidine
- Triclosan
