= Waldeyer's tonsillar ring =

Ringed arrangement of lymphoid tissue in the pharynx

Waldeyer's ring
- Regional lymphatics; Waldeyer's ring labeled at the center top

Details
- System: Lymphatic system

Identifiers
- Latin: anulus lymphoideus pharyngis

Waldeyer's tonsillar ring (also known as the pharyngeal lymphoid ring, Waldeyer's lymphatic ring, Waldeyer's or Waldeyer ring, or tonsillar ring) is a ringed arrangement of lymphoid organs in the pharynx. Waldeyer's ring surrounds the naso- and oropharynx, with some of its tonsillar tissue located above and some below the soft palate (and to the back of the mouth cavity).

== Structure ==
The ring consists of the following (from top to bottom):

- 1 pharyngeal tonsil (or "adenoid"), located on the roof of the nasopharynx, under the sphenoid bone.
- 2 tubal tonsils on each side, where each auditory tube opens into the nasopharynx
- 2 palatine tonsils (commonly called "the tonsils") located in the oropharynx
- lingual tonsils, a collection of lymphatic tissue located on the back part of the tongue

=== Terminology ===
Some authors speak of two pharyngeal tonsils/two adenoids. These authors look at the left and right halves of the pharyngeal tonsil as two tonsils. Many authors also speak of lingual tonsils (in the plural), because this accumulation of lymphoid tissue consists of several little prominences – many smaller rounded masses. Whether to collectively call all these a single tonsil or separate tonsils is to an extent an arbitrary decision.

=== Variation ===
There also normally is a good amount of mucosa-associated lymphoid tissue (MALT) present between all these tonsils (intertonsillar) around the ring, and more of this lymphoid tissue can variably be found more or less throughout at least the naso- and oropharynx.

=== Development ===
The tubal tonsils usually develop from an accumulation of lymphoid tissue in the pharyngeal tonsil.

== Clinical significance ==
The palatine tonsils, when inflamed/swollen, are more common in children and can obstruct respiration.

Inflammation of the tonsils is called tonsillitis and removal is called tonsillectomy.

== Etymology ==
Waldeyer's ring was named after the nineteenth-century German anatomist Heinrich Wilhelm Gottfried von Waldeyer-Hartz.

== Other animals ==
Some animals, but not humans, have one or two additional tonsils:

- Soft palate tonsil
- Paraepiglottic tonsil
