= Tonsil stones =

Mineralized debris within the crevices of the tonsils

- Other names: Tonsillolith, tonsillolithiasis, tonsillar stones, chronic caseous tonsillitis
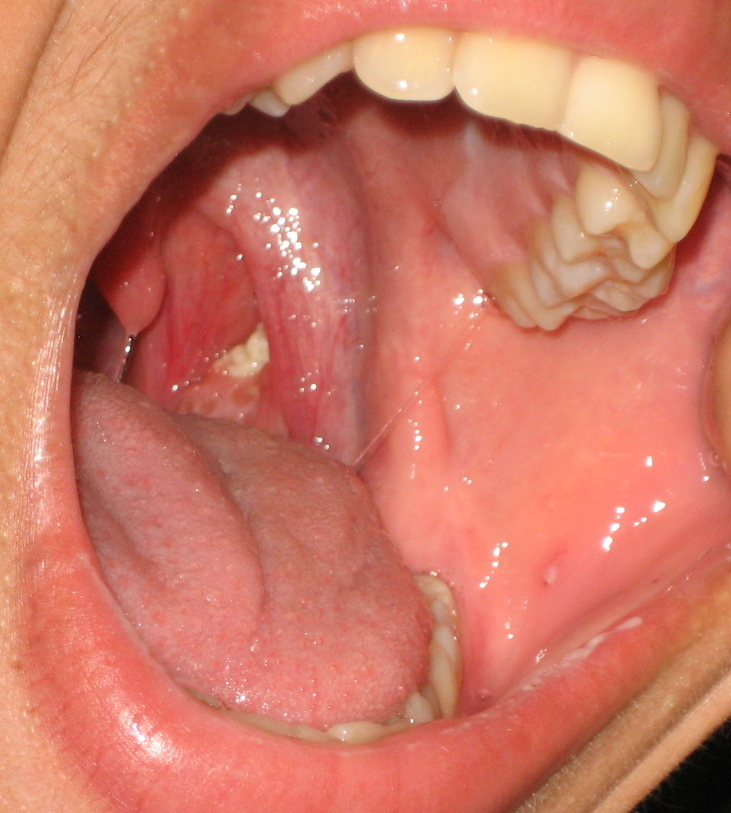
- A tonsillolith lodged in the tonsillar crypt
- Specialty: Otorhinolaryngology
- Symptoms: Discomfort, bad breath
- Risk factors: Recurrent throat infections
- Differential diagnosis: Calcified granulomatous disease, mycosis, syphilis
- Treatment: Gargling with salt water, tonsillectomy
- Medication: Chlorhexidine or cetylpyridinium chloride
- Frequency: Up to 10%

Tonsil stones, also known as tonsilloliths, are mineralizations of debris within the crevices of the tonsils. When not mineralized, the presence of debris is known as chronic caseous tonsillitis (CCT). Symptoms may include bad breath, foreign body sensation, sore throat, pain or discomfort with swallowing, and coughing. Generally there is no pain, though there may be the feeling of something present. The presence of tonsil stones may be otherwise undetectable; however, some people have reported seeing white material in the rear of their throat, or a smell.

Risk factors may include recurrent throat infections. Tonsil stones contain a biofilm composed of several different bacteria, and calcium salts, either alone or in combination with other mineral salts. While they most commonly occur in the palatine tonsils, they may also occur in the adenoids, lingual tonsils and tubal tonsil. Tonsil stones have been recorded weighing from 0.3 g to 42 g, and they are typically small in size. However, there are occasional reports of large tonsilloliths. They are often discovered during medical imaging for other reasons, and more recently, due to the impact and influence of social media platforms such as TikTok, medical professionals have experienced an increase in patient concern and tonsillolith evaluations.

They are usually benign, so if tonsil stones do not bother the patient, no treatment is needed. However, in rare cases, tonsilloliths have presented patients with further complications necessitating surgical extraction. Tonsilloliths that exceed the average size are typically seen in older individuals, as the likelihood of developing tonsil stones is linear with age. Up to 10% of people have tonsil stones. Biological sex does not influence the chance of having tonsil stones, but older people are more commonly affected. Many people opt to extract their own tonsil stones manually or with developments in dental hygiene products. Water flossers have become a more common mechanism to extract tonsilloliths and alleviate the discomfort and complications they cause. Tonsil stones can become dislodged on their own while eating, drinking, gargling, and coughing. Additionally, an exhalation technique that vigorously shakes the tonsils may be performed to dislodge them. This involves loudly producing a voiceless velar fricative sound, at various pitches, to shake both the palatine and lingual tonsils.

== Signs and symptoms ==
Tonsil stones may produce no symptoms, or they may be associated with bad breath. In fact, many dental professionals argue that tonsil stones are the leading cause of bad breath in their patients. The smell may be that of rotting eggs. Tonsil stones tend to happen most often in people with long-term inflammation in their tonsils.

Occasionally there may be pain when swallowing. Even when they are large, some tonsil stones are only discovered incidentally on X-rays or CAT scans. Other symptoms include a metallic taste, throat closing or tightening, coughing fits, an itchy throat, and choking.

Larger tonsil stones may cause recurrent bad breath, which frequently accompanies a tonsil infection, sore throat, white debris, a bad taste in the back of the throat, difficulty swallowing, earache, and tonsil swelling. A medical study conducted in 2007 found an association between tonsilloliths and bad breath in patients with a certain type of recurrent tonsillitis. Among those with bad breath, 75% of the subjects had tonsilloliths, while only 6% of subjects with normal halitometry values (normal breath) had tonsilloliths. A foreign body sensation may also exist in the back of the throat. The condition may also be an asymptomatic condition, with detection upon palpating a hard intratonsillar or submucosal mass.

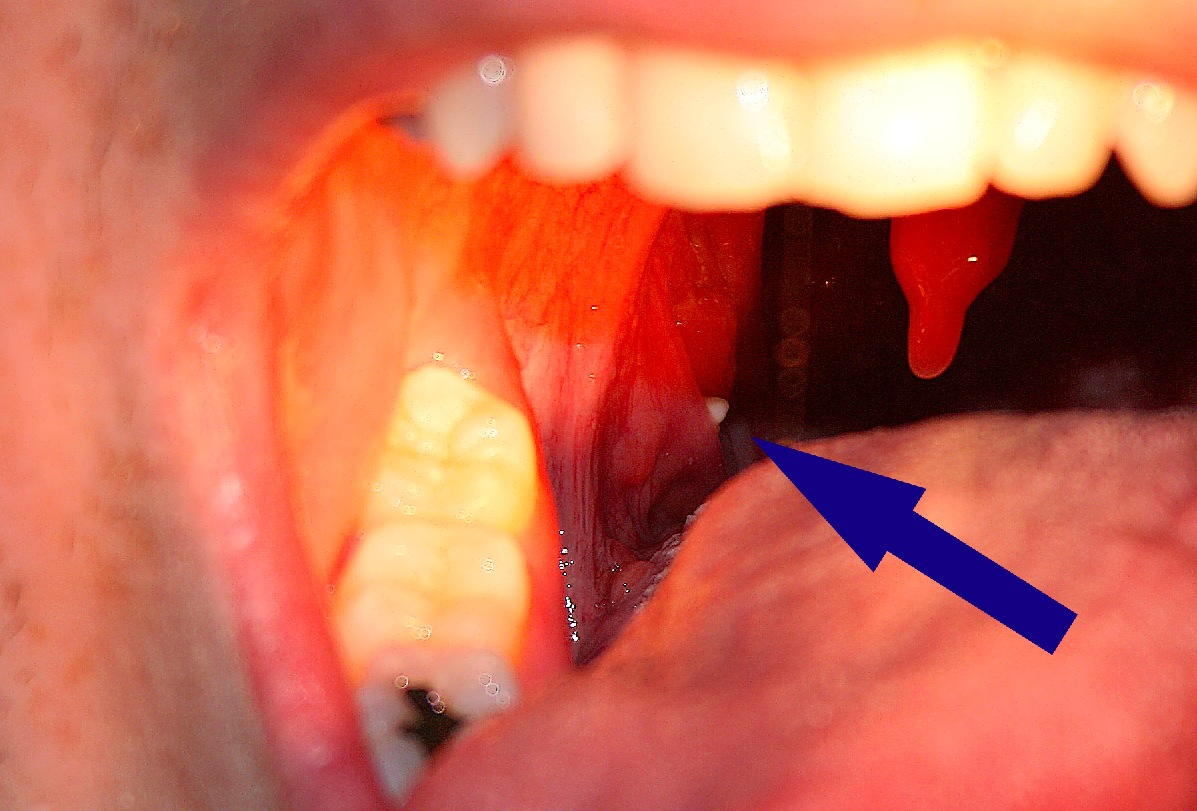
A tonsillolith protrudes from the tonsil

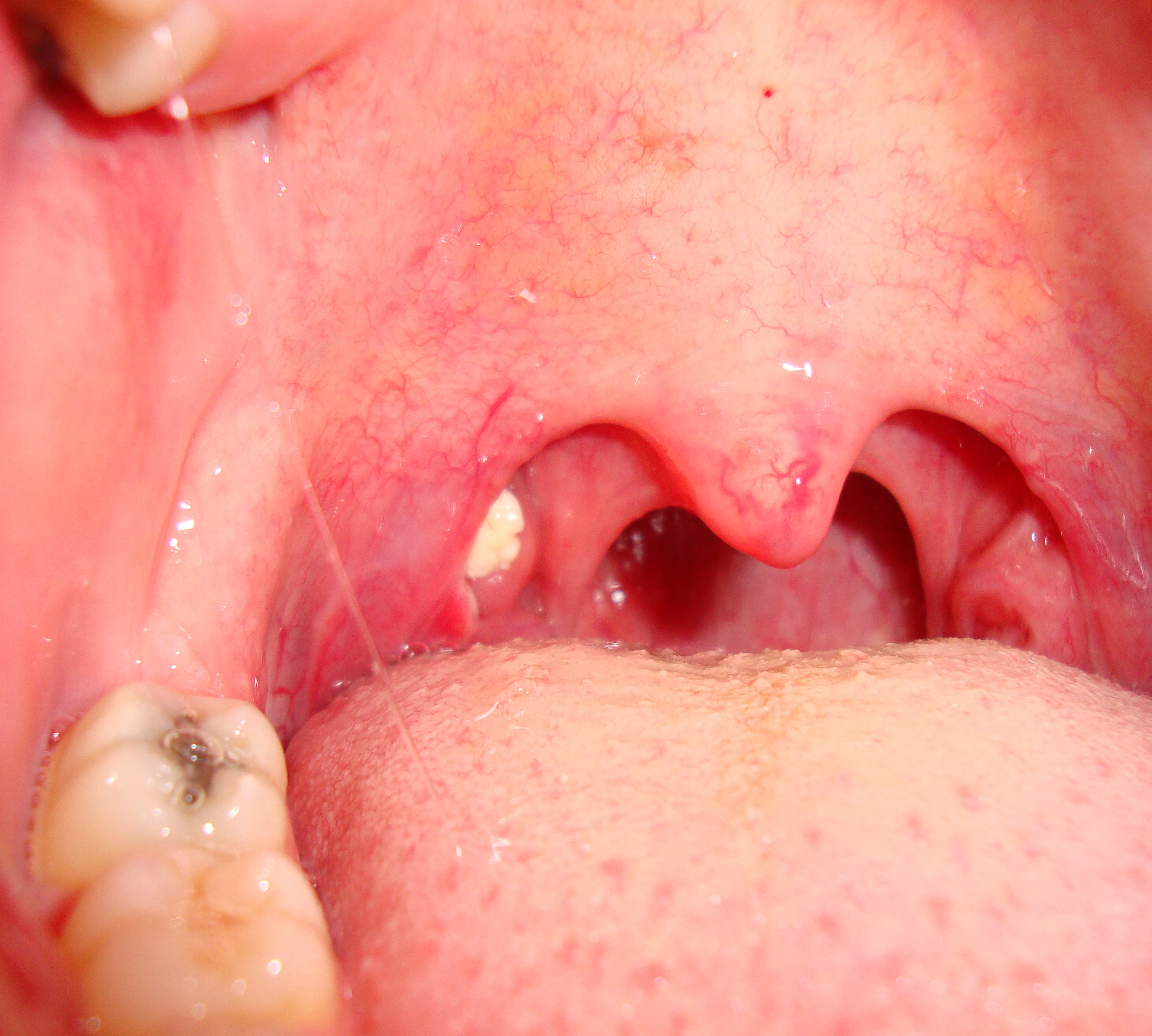
Large tonsillolith half exposed on tonsil

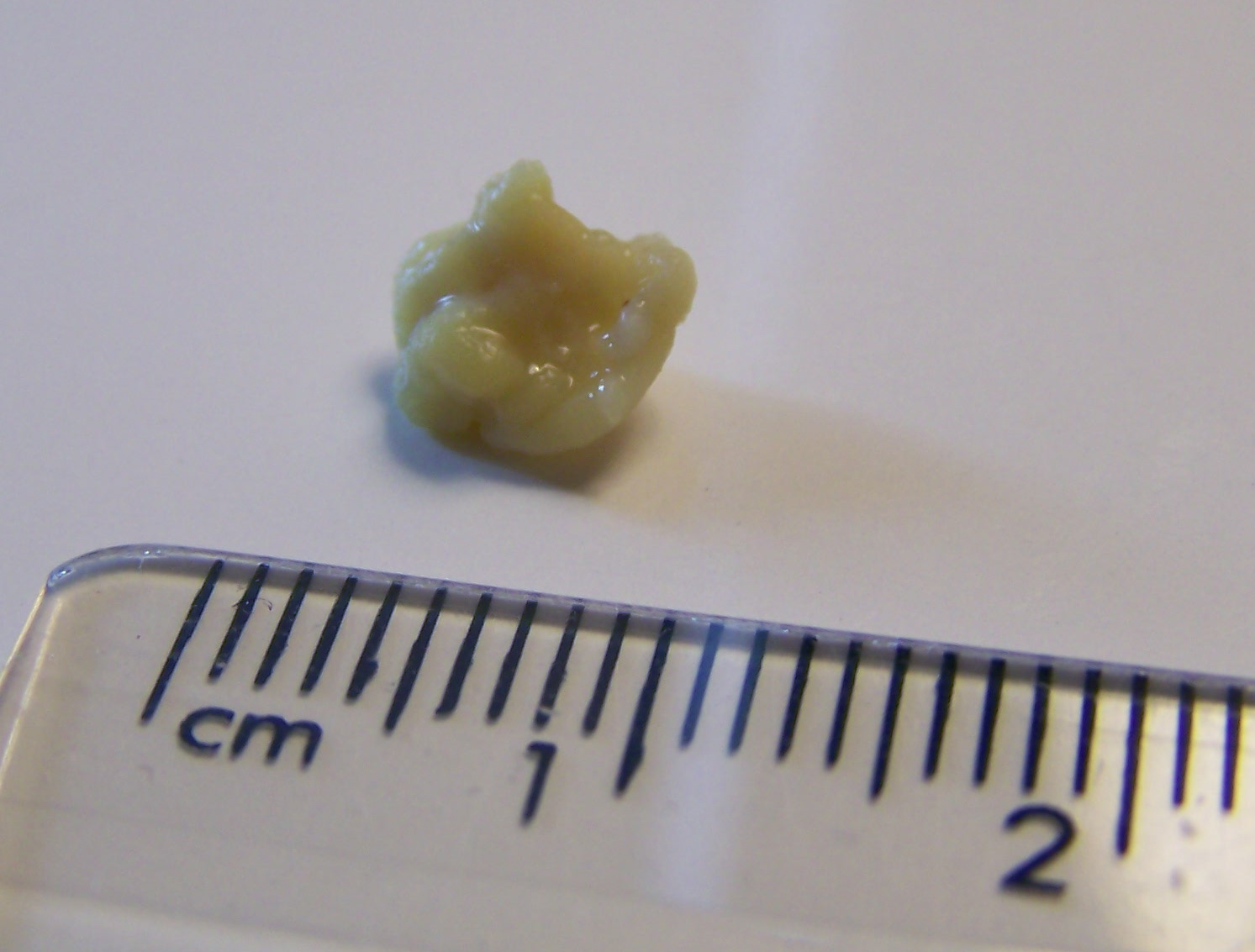
Closeup of a tonsillolith

== Pathophysiology ==
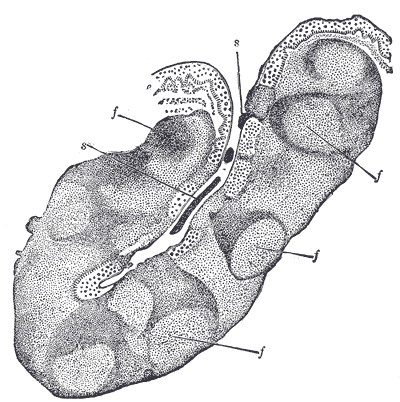
Low-power microscope magnification of a cross-section through one of the tonsillar crypts (running diagonally) as it opens onto the surface of the throat (at the top). Stratified epithelium (e) covers the throat's surface and continues as a lining of the crypt. Beneath the surface are numerous nodules (f) of lymphoid tissue. Many lymph cells (dark-colored region) pass from the nodules toward the surface and will eventually mix with the saliva as salivary corpuscles (s).

The mechanism by which these calculi form is subject to debate. However, they appear to result from the accumulation of material retained within the crypts, along with the growth of bacteria and fungi—sometimes in association with persistent chronic purulent tonsillitis.

In 2009, an association between biofilms and tonsilloliths was shown. Central to the biofilm concept is the assumption that bacteria form a three-dimensional structure, with dormant bacteria in the center to serve as a constant nidus (breeding ground) of infection. This impermeable structure renders the biofilm immune to antibiotic treatment. By use of confocal microscopy and microelectrodes, biofilms similar to dental biofilms were shown to be present in the tonsillolith, with oxygen respiration at the outer layer of the tonsillolith, denitrification toward the middle layer, and acidification toward the core.

== Cause and diagnosis ==
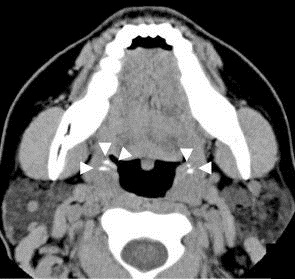
CT scan of tonsilloliths

Diagnosis is usually made upon inspection. Tonsilloliths are difficult to diagnose in the absence of clear manifestations, and often constitute casual findings of routine radiological studies. The cause of tonsil stones can include a multitude of sources from bacterial infections, streptococcus bacteria, viral infections, adenoviruses, influenza virus, enteroviruses, and parainfluenza virus.

=== Classification ===
Tonsilloliths or tonsil stones are calcifications that form in the crypts of the palatal tonsils. They are also known to form in the throat and on the roof of the mouth. Tonsils are filled with crevices where bacteria and other materials, including dead cells and mucus, can become trapped. When this occurs, the debris can become concentrated in white formations that occur in the pockets. Researchers found aerobic bacteria present on the surface of tonsilloliths and anaerobic bacteria at the core of tonsilloliths. They have the potential to cause oral halitosis as they contain volatile sulfur compounds and sulfur-derived gases, foul-smelling compounds produced during bacterial metabolism. Tonsilloliths are formed when this trapped debris accumulates and are expressed from the tonsil. They are generally soft, sometimes rubbery. This tends to occur most often in people who suffer from chronic inflammation in their tonsils or repeated bouts of tonsillitis. They are often associated with post-nasal drip.

=== Enlarged tonsil stones ===
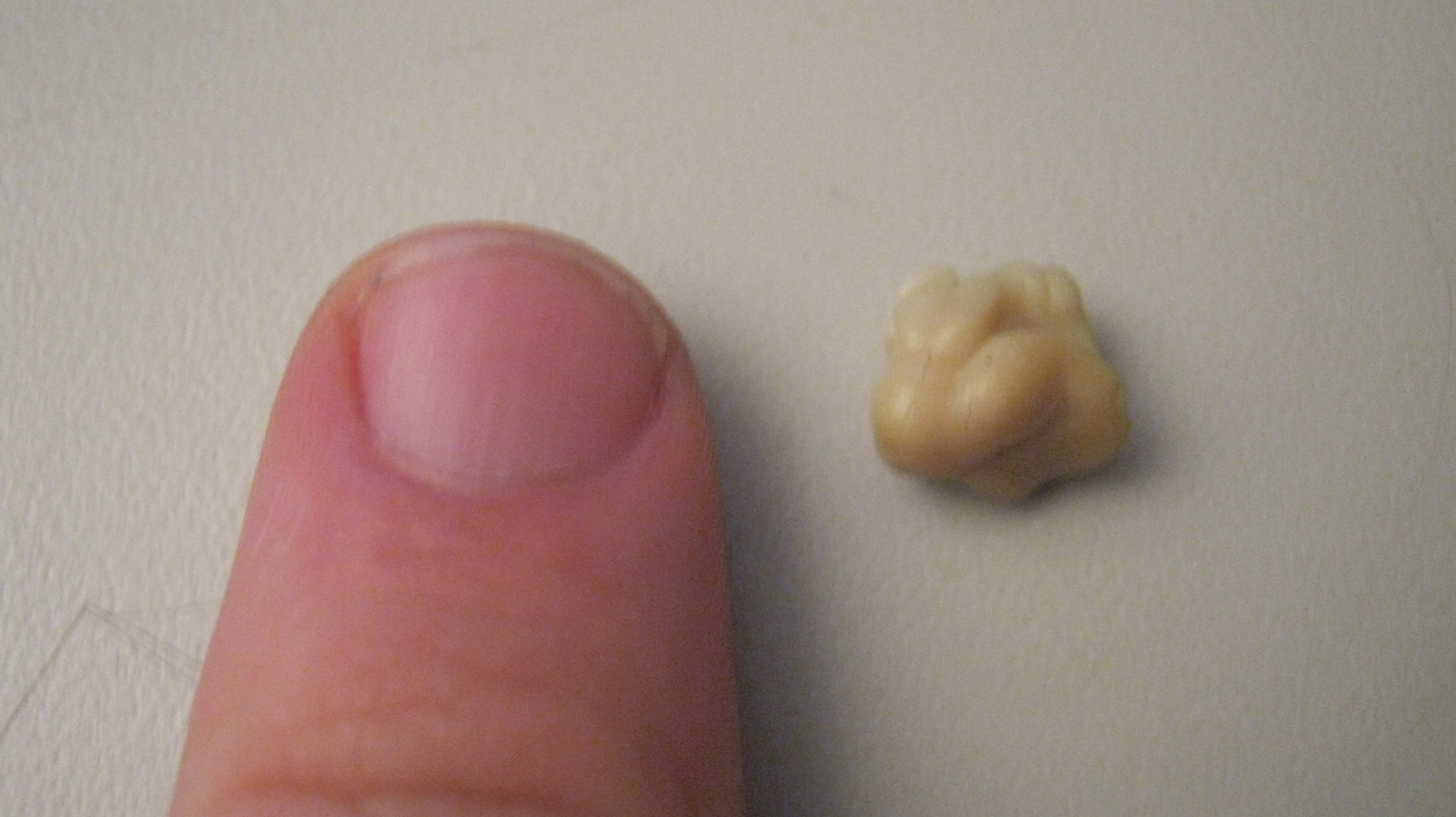
General size of a tonsilolith (right) compared to a finger (left)

Much rarer than the typical tonsil stones are giant tonsilloliths. Giant tonsilloliths may often be mistaken for other oral maladies, including peritonsillar abscess, and tumors of the tonsil. On average, tonsil stones should appear within a similar range of the image shown here; however, individuals with extenuating cases have been reported. In these instances, extensive care such as extraction by a licensed medical professional may be needed.

=== Differential diagnosis ===
Imaging diagnostic techniques can identify a radiopaque mass that may be mistaken for foreign bodies, displaced teeth, or calcified blood vessels. CT scan may reveal nonspecific calcified images in the tonsillar zone. The differential diagnosis must be established with acute and chronic tonsillitis, tonsillar hypertrophy, peritonsillar abscesses, foreign bodies, phlebolites, ectopic bone or cartilage, lymph nodes, granulomatous lesions or calcification of the stylohyoid ligament in the context of Eagle syndrome (elongated styloid process).

The differential diagnosis of tonsilloliths includes a foreign body, a calcified granuloma, malignancy, an enlarged temporal styloid process or rarely, isolated bone which is usually derived from embryonic rests originating from the branchial arches.

== Treatment ==
If tonsil stones do not bother a person, no treatment is needed. Otherwise, gargling with saltwater and manual removal may be tried. Chlorhexidine or cetylpyridinium chloride may also be tried. Surgical treatment may include partial or complete tonsil removal.

Some people are able to remove tonsil stones using a cotton swab. Oral irrigators are also effective. Most electric oral irrigators are unsuitable for tonsil stone removal because they are too powerful and are likely to cause discomfort and rupture the tonsils, which could result in further complications such as infection. Irrigators that connect directly to the sink tap via a threaded attachment or otherwise are suitable for tonsil stone removal and everyday washing of the tonsils because they can jet water at low-pressure levels that the user can adjust by simply manipulating the sink tap, allowing for a continuous range of pressures to suit each user's requirements.

There are also manually pressurized tonsil stone removers. A manual pump-type tonsil stone remover can adjust the water pressure depending on the number of pumps, effectively removing tonsil stones.

More simply still, gargling with warm, salty water may help alleviate the discomfort of tonsillitis, which often accompanies tonsil stones. Vigorous gargling each morning can also keep the tonsil crypts clear of all but the most persistent tonsilloliths.

=== Curettage ===
Larger tonsil stones may require removal by curettage (scooping) or otherwise, although thorough irrigation will still be required afterward to wash out smaller pieces effectively. Larger lesions may require local excision, although these treatments may not completely help the bad breath issues that are often associated with this condition.

=== Laser ===
Another option is to decrease the surface area (crypts, crevices, etc.) of the tonsils via laser resurfacing. The procedure is called a laser cryptolysis. It can be performed using a local anesthetic. A scanned carbon dioxide laser selectively vaporizes and smooths the surface of the tonsils. This technique flattens the edges of the crypts and crevices that collect the debris, preventing trapped material from forming stones.

=== Surgery ===
Tonsillectomy may be indicated if bad breath due to tonsillar stones persists despite other measures.

== Epidemiology ==
Tonsilloliths or tonsillar concretions occur in up to 10% of the population, frequently due to episodes of tonsillitis. While small concretions in the tonsils are common, true stones are less so. They commonly occur in young adults and are rare in children.
