= Toothpick =

Small stick for cleaning teeth

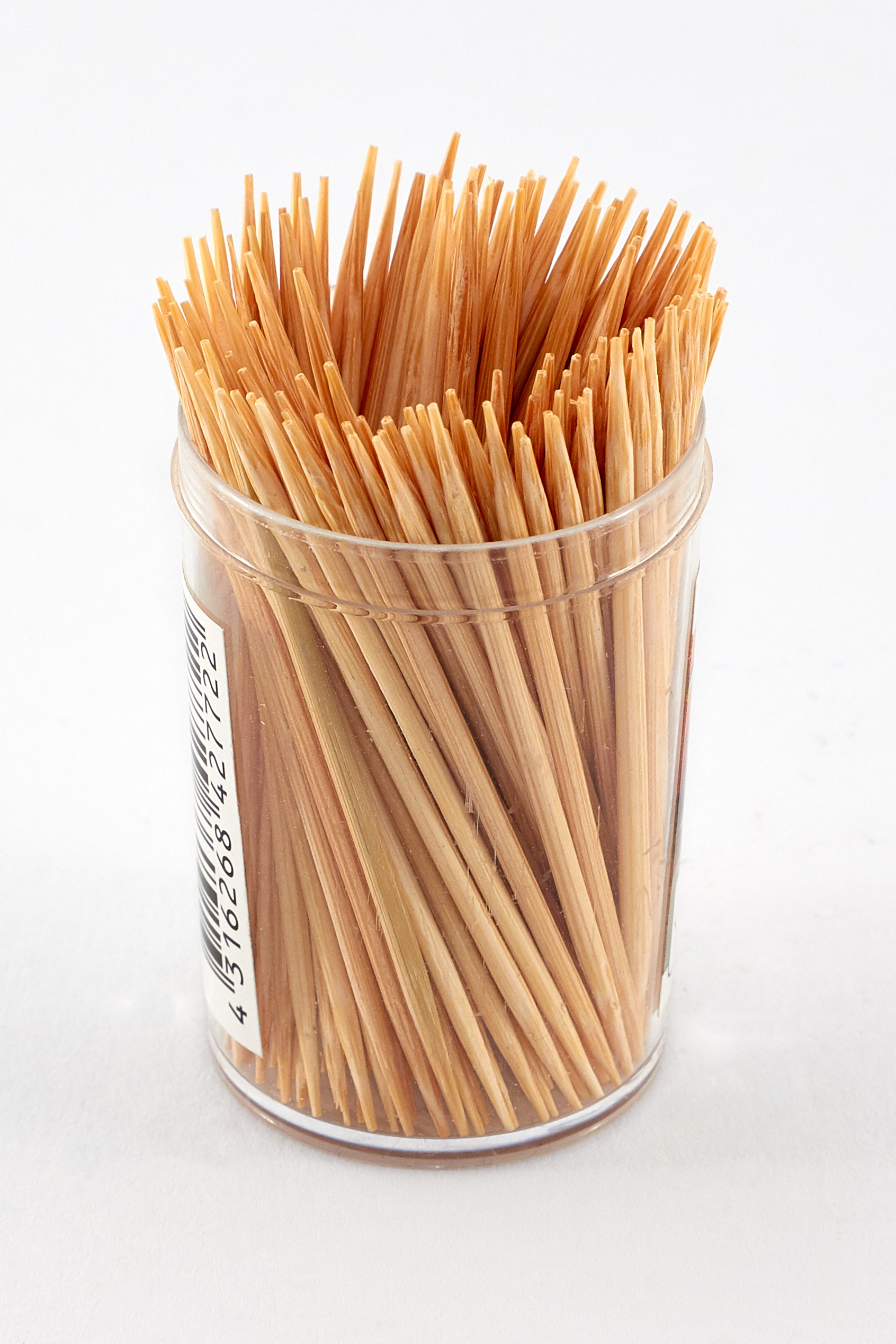
Wood toothpicks

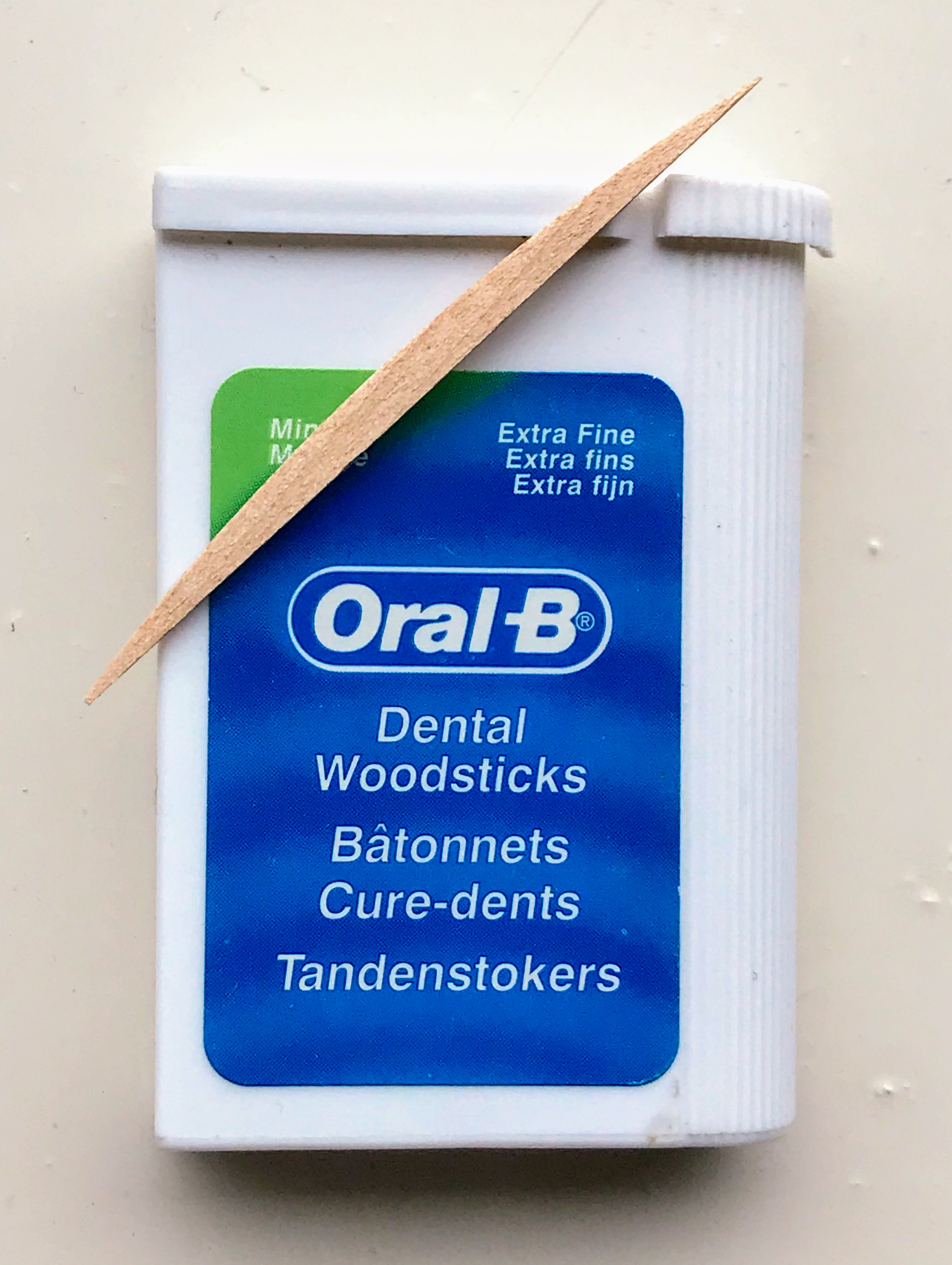
Oral B toothpicks

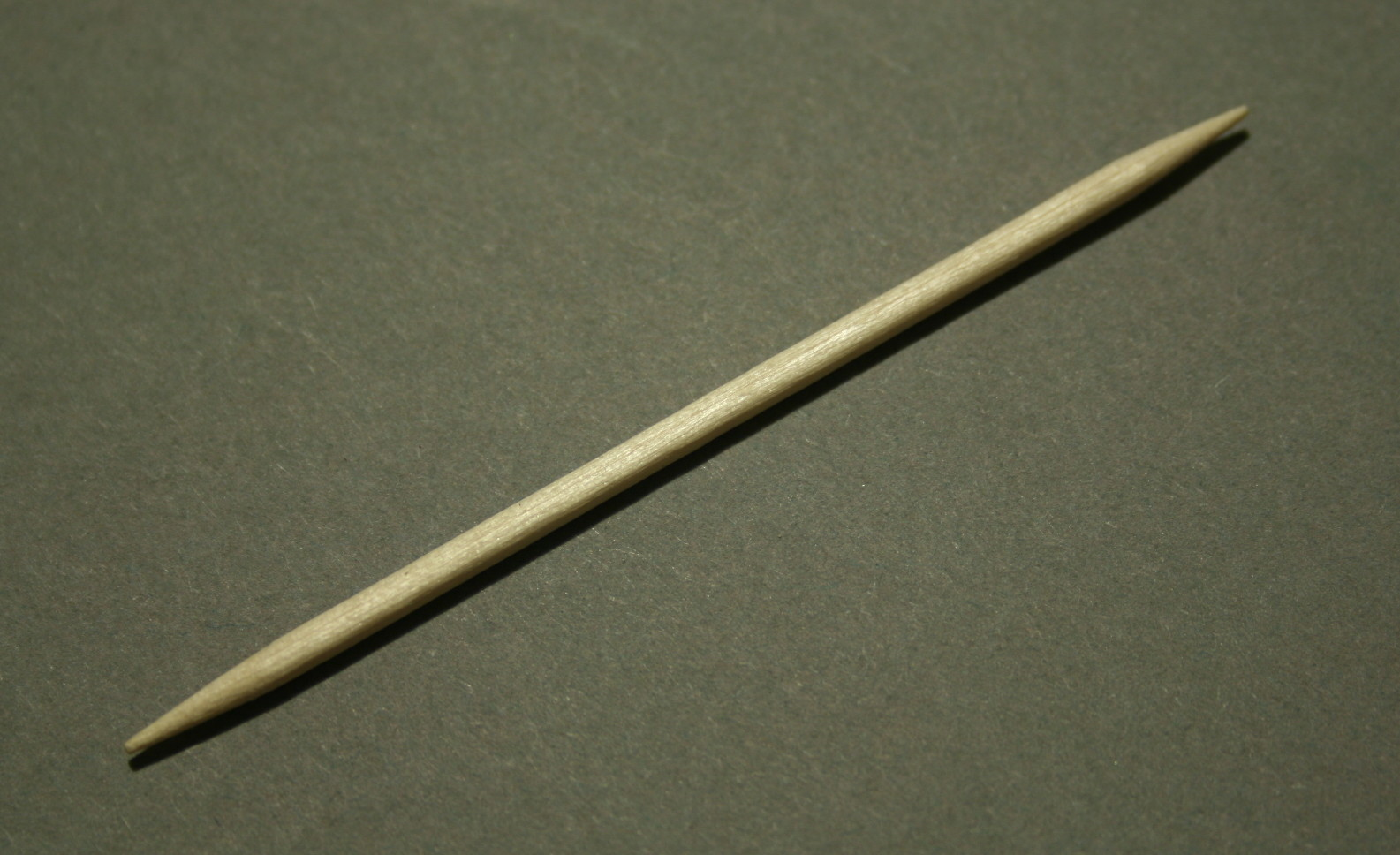
Bamboo toothpick

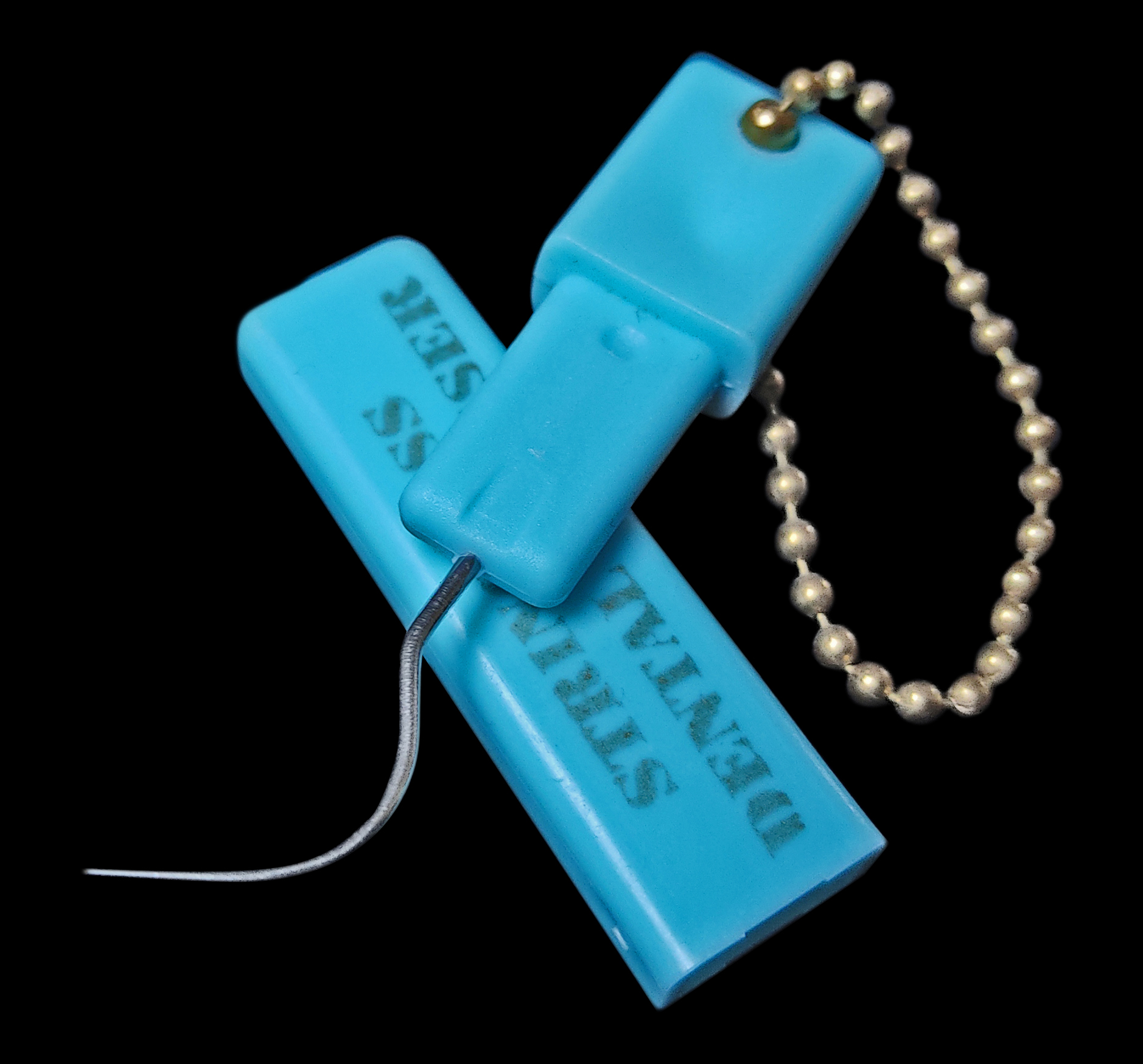
Curved metal toothpick (reusable)

A toothpick is a small thin stick of wood, plastic, bamboo, metal, bone or other substance with at least one and sometimes two pointed ends to insert between teeth to remove detritus, usually after a meal. Toothpicks are also used in food decoration and tableware as cocktail skewers; they are used to hold or spear small appetizers (like cheese cubes or olives), and can be decorated with plastic frills, small paper umbrellas or flags.

== History ==
Known in all cultures, the toothpick is the oldest instrument for dental cleaning. Hominin remains from Dmanisi, Georgia, dated to about 1.8 million years ago, bear lesions indicating the repeated use of a "toothpick". A Neanderthal man's jawbone found in the Cova Foradà in Spain evidenced use of a toothpick to alleviate pain in his teeth caused by periodontal disease and dental wear. Toothpicks made of bronze have been found as burial objects in prehistoric graves in Northern Italy and in the East Alps. In 1986, researchers in Florida discovered the 7500-year-old remains of ancient Native Americans and discovered small grooves between many of the molar teeth. One of the researchers, Justin Martin of Concordia University Wisconsin, said, "The enamel on teeth is quite tough, so they must have used the probes quite rigorously to make the grooves."

== Materials and manufacture ==
There are delicate, artistic examples made of silver in antiquity, as well as from mastic wood with the Romans.

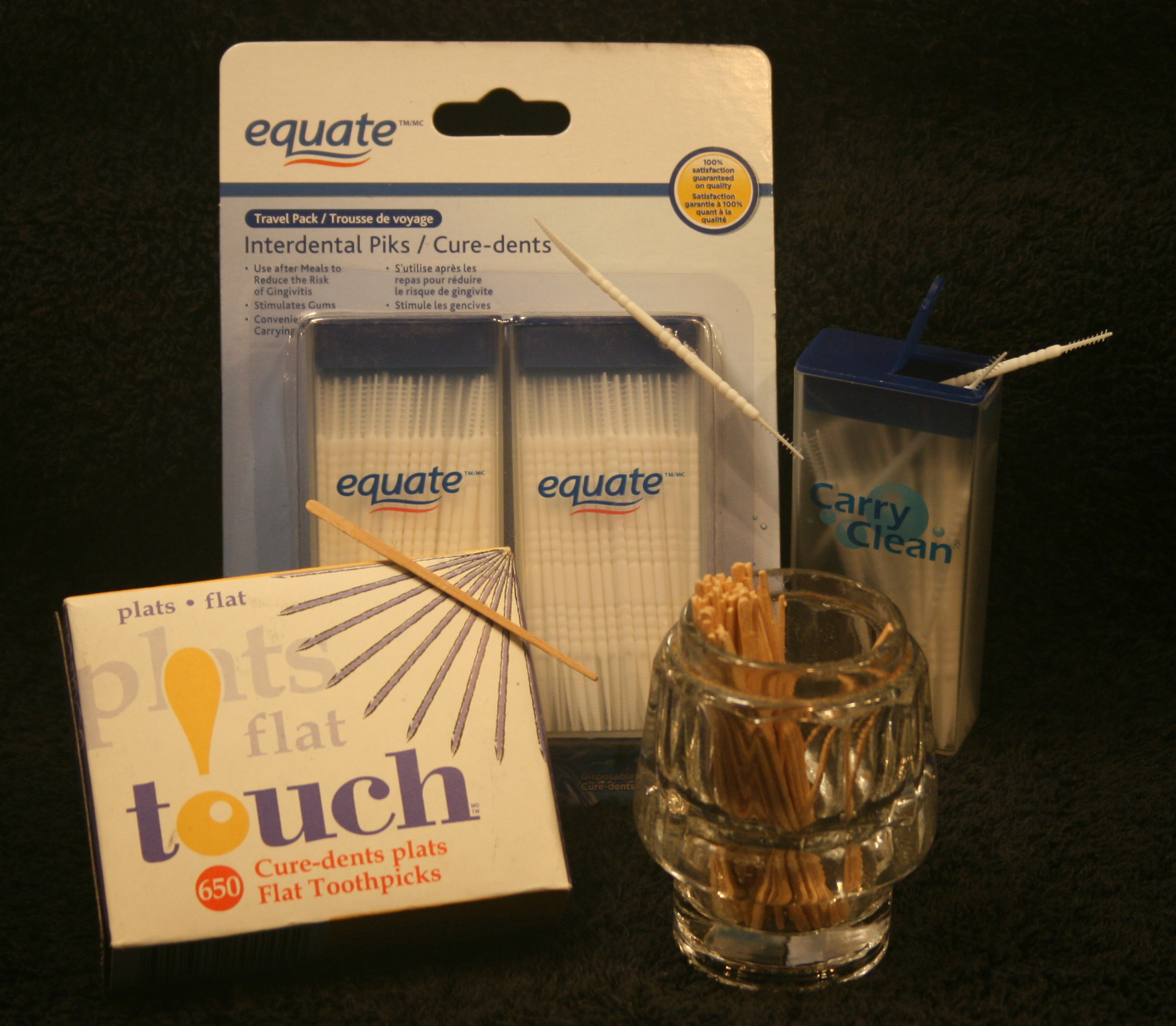
Plastic interdental piks designed to prevent gingivitis, and wooden flat toothpicks

In the 17th century, toothpicks were luxury objects and like jewelry, were artfully stylized using precious metal and set with expensive stones.

According to a local historian in the Southern United States, the baculum (penis bone) of a raccoon, called a "coon rod", (Note: Other nicknames are "Alabama toothpick", "Arkansas toothpick", "mountain man toothpick" and "Texas toothpick") was sometimes filed to a point for use as a toothpick.

The first toothpick-manufacturing machine was developed in 1869, by Marc Signorello. Another was patented in 1872, by Silas Noble and J. P. Cooley.

Wooden toothpicks are cut from birch wood. Logs are first spiral cut into thin sheets, which are then cut, chopped, milled and bleached (to lighten) into the individual toothpicks. Nowadays other means of interdental cleaning are preferred such as dental floss, toothbrushes, and oral irrigators.

== Dentistry ==
Dentists generally prefer floss to picks because of possible damages to oral health, specifically to the gum, to tooth enamel (if chewed), and to tooth roots (if the gum is pushed low enough). Picks may also damage veneers and crowns, have splinters, or be accidentally swallowed.

A review of small-scale studies indicates that toothpicks and triangular woodsticks are similar in their ability to remove plaque.

== Injuries ==
Ingestion of cocktail sticks, or fragments of them, has been known to cause injuries in several parts of the alimentary canal.

== See also ==
- Oral hygiene
- Teeth cleaning twig
