= Archives of Oral Sciences and Research =

Official publication of Govt. Dental College, Bangalore

AOSR - The Archives of Oral Sciences and Research is the official publication of the Government Dental College and Research Institute, Bangalore, India which aims to publish quality, peer reviewed original research papers and topical reviews within clinical dentistry, on all basic science aspects of structure, chemistry, developmental biology, physiology and pathology of relevant tissues, as well as on microbiology, biomaterials and the behavioural sciences as they relate to dentistry including molecular studies related to oral health and disease.

Archives of Oral Sciences & Research strive to provide scope for exchange of relevant information and enhancement of the profession with the purpose of promoting oral health for patients and communities.

Archives of Oral Sciences and Research is published quarterly. Editor-in-Chief is A. R. Pradeep.
