= Interdental cleaning =

Cleaning between the teeth

Interdental cleaning or interproximal cleaning is part of oral hygiene where the aim is to clean the areas in between the teeth, otherwise known as the proximal surfaces of teeth. This is to remove the dental plaque in areas a toothbrush cannot reach. The ultimate goal of interproximal cleaning is to prevent the development of interproximal caries and periodontal disease. The combined use of tooth brushing and mechanical and manual interdental cleaning devices has been proven to reduce the prevalence of caries and periodontal diseases.

== Floss ==
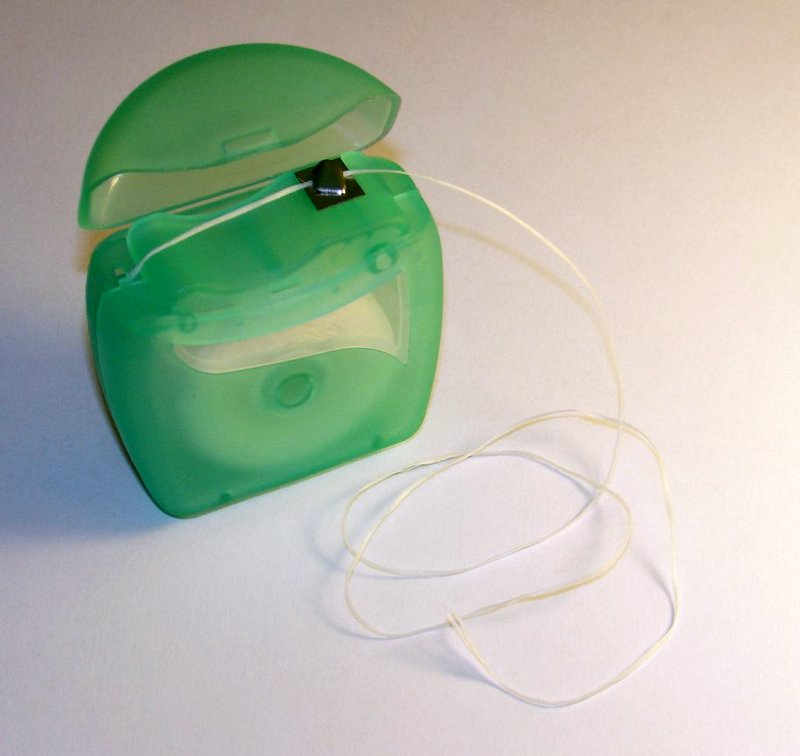
Dental floss

Floss is one of the most commonly used interdental cleaners. It is traditionally made of waxed nylon wrapped up in a plastic box. Since dental floss is able to remove some inter-proximal plaque, frequent regular dental flossing will reduce inter-proximal caries and periodontal disease risks. Results of a high-level of evidence meta-analysis recently found that floss may not be the most effective method for interdental cleaning, contrary to common belief at the time. Especially for individuals lacking dexterity or compliance, waterjet irrigators and interdental brushes were found to be significantly more effective than flossing.

=== Frequency and role in daily oral hygiene ===
Interdental spaces should be cleaned at least once a day; this complements toothbrushing. There is insufficient evidence for a single optimal time or sequence for interdental cleaning relative to toothbrushing, so the timing and order can be adapted to individual preference and routine. The choice of interdental cleaning device should be individualized according to the size of the interdental space, ease of use, manual dexterity, motivation, and patient preference; oral irrigators can be considered when dexterity is limited.

== Interdental brush ==
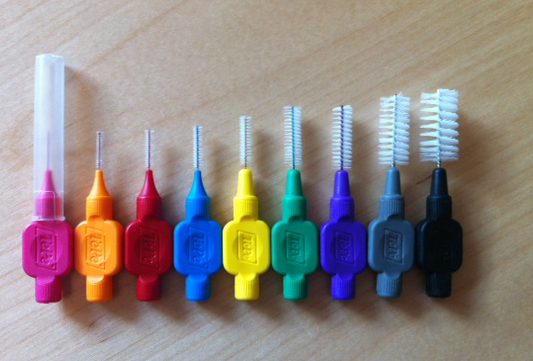
Wire-and-nylon interdental brushes in a range of sizes

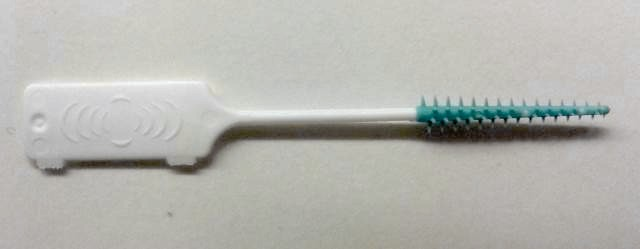
Rubbery interdental brush

Interdental brushes commonly consist of either a central metal wire core with soft nylon filaments twisted around, or an elastomer, and are available in various sizes to correspond to different spaces between teeth. Various factors—such as the brush's material, geometry, and size—can be selected to optimize its efficiency and performance.

- Material: metal wire may be sensitive to certain patients, thereby rubber might be preferred.
- Geometry: Straight interdental brushes are considered more effective compared to angled interproximal plaque removal.
- Size: This varies depending on the space between individual teeth. Failure to use an appropriate size may account for the lack of efficiency of the interdental cleaning aid.

Interdental brushes are not designed for the same long lifespan as regular toothbrushes. On average, an interdental brush may need to be replaced after 7–14 uses.

For those with braces, bridges, or dental implants, interdental brushes are especially helpful. They can manoeuvre around wires and brackets or under bridges, where plaque can accumulate, helping to maintain the integrity of dental work and supporting long-term oral health. Individuals with orthodontic appliances are recommended to choose conical-shaped brushes. The narrow top part does an excellent job of cleaning fine details. The lower and wider half removes food debris between teeth and around the structure. For cleaning brackets, forward and backwards motions are used.

To select the correct size interdental brush, it is necessary to consult a dental hygienist. They will measure the interdental spaces with a special probe and determine the appropriate width of the brushes. Typically, narrower brushes are needed for the front teeth, and wider ones for the molars.

According to the rules, interdental spaces are cleaned first. Then, with the help of a brush, the front, inner, and chewing surfaces of the teeth are cleaned. Brush movements should be strictly vertical, from the gum to the cutting edge of the tooth, to avoid pushing plaque back into the spaces between the teeth.

== Oral irrigator ==
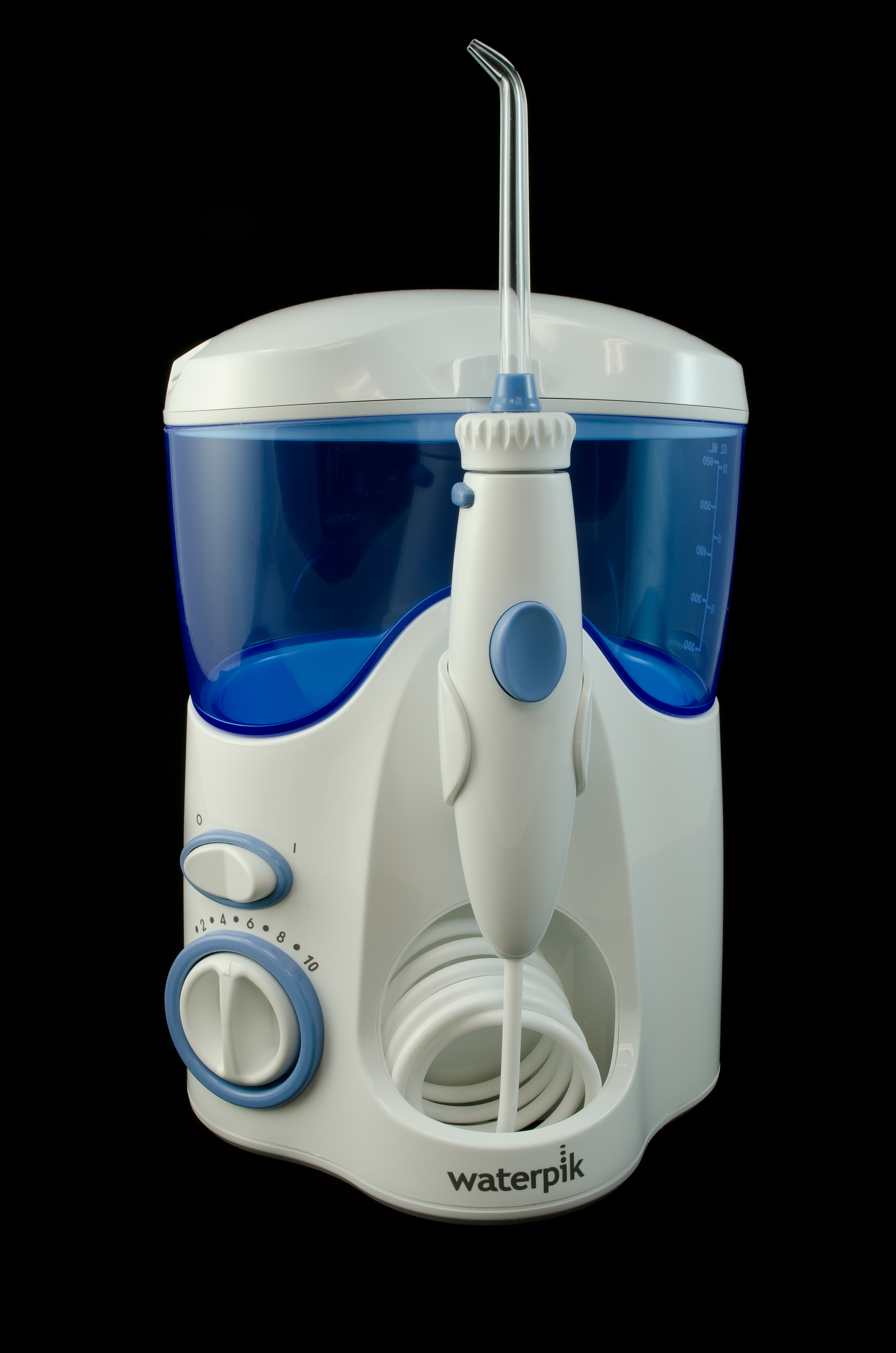
A Water Pik water flosser

Oral Irrigators (also called water flossers) are common mechanical tools used for interdental cleaning. It uses a combination of pulsation and pressure facilitated by water or air to remove debris and bacteria both above and below the gums. When used with tooth brushing, the use of oral irrigators reduces inflammation of the gums (gingivitis) by removing loosely adherent plaque. It is also beneficial for implant maintenance as there is less bleeding around implants when oral irrigators are used compared to dental floss.

== Toothpick ==
Toothpicks are slender sticks, made from a variety of materials, designed to be inserted between teeth for cleaning the interdental spaces. Although there is a long history of use dating back to 1.8 million years ago, dentists generally discourage their use due to the danger of causing mechanical damage to gum, enamel, and tooth roots.
