= Zodiac Nautic =

French inflatable boat manufacturer

Z Nautic Group

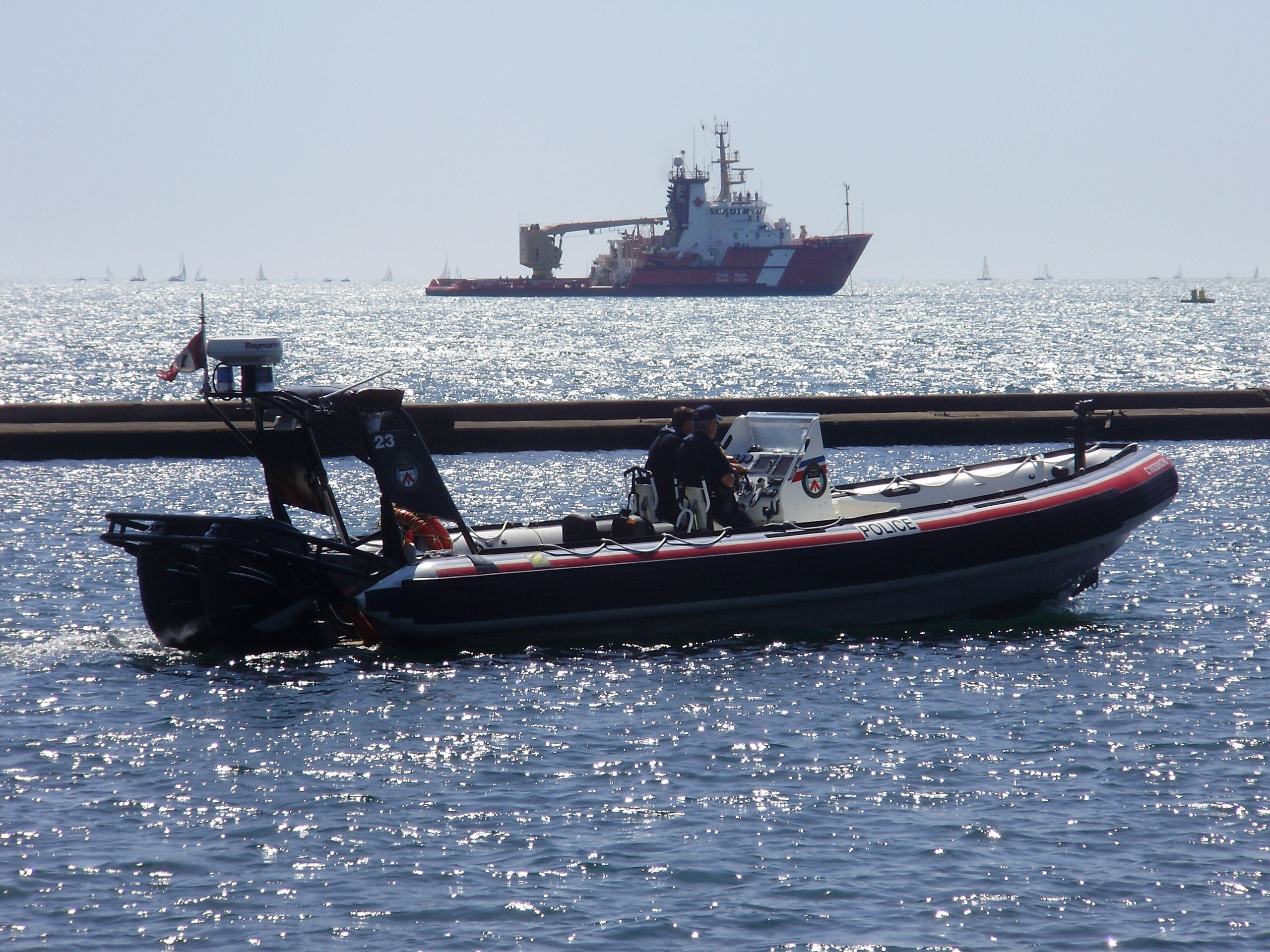
- A Toronto Police Service Zodiac, 2008.
- Trade name: Zodiac Nautic
- Formerly: Zodiac Marine & Pool, Zodiac Marine
- Company type: Private (Société par Actions Simplifiée)
- Industry: construction of pleasure boats
- Founded: 1896; 130 years ago
- Founder: Maurice Mallet
- Headquarters: Gujan-Mestras, France
- Area served: Worldwide
- Brands: Zodiac; Bombard; AKA Marine
- Parent: Zodiac Group (1896–2007)
- Website: www.znauticgroup.com/en-us

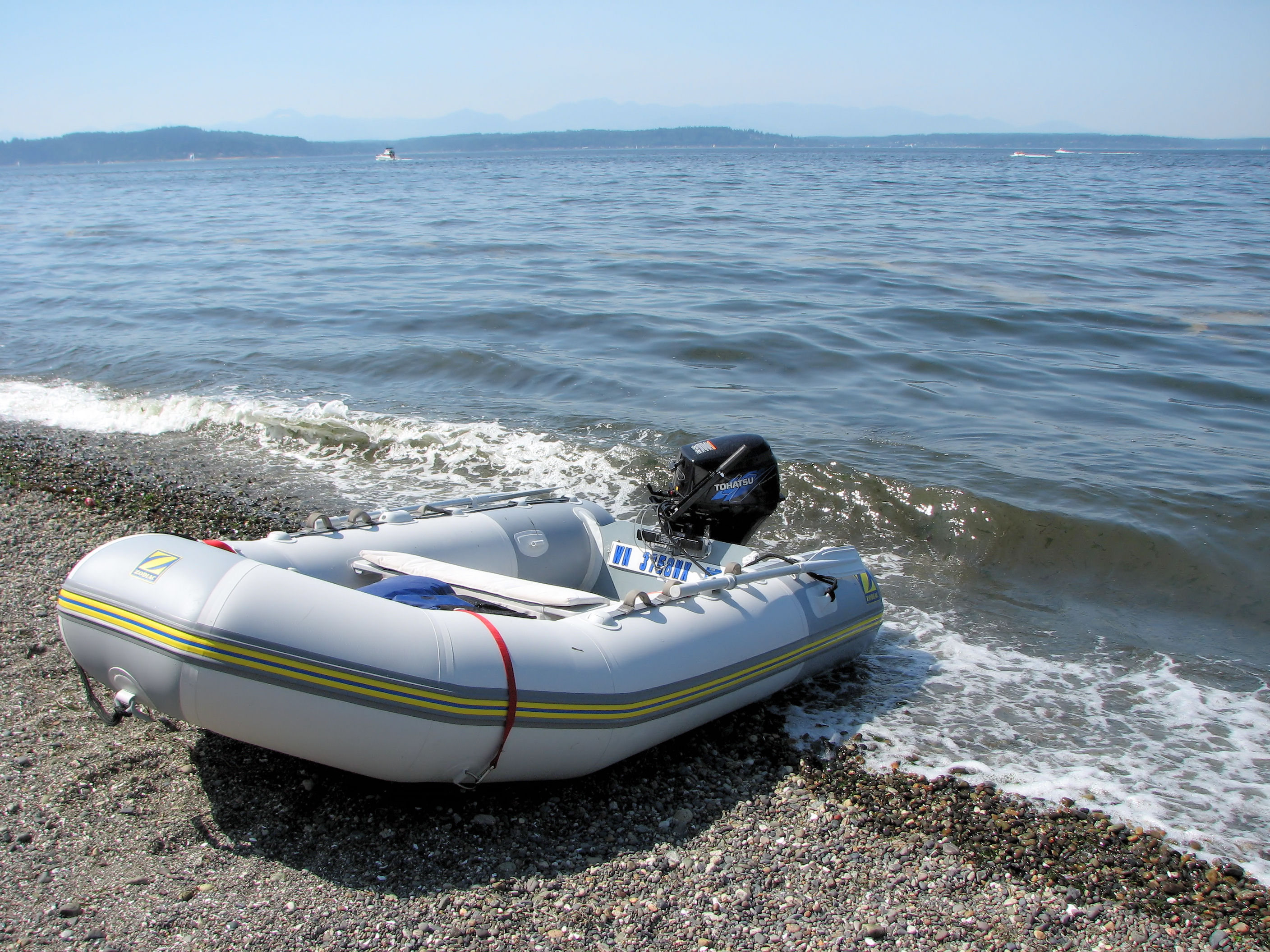
A Zodiac boat on the beach

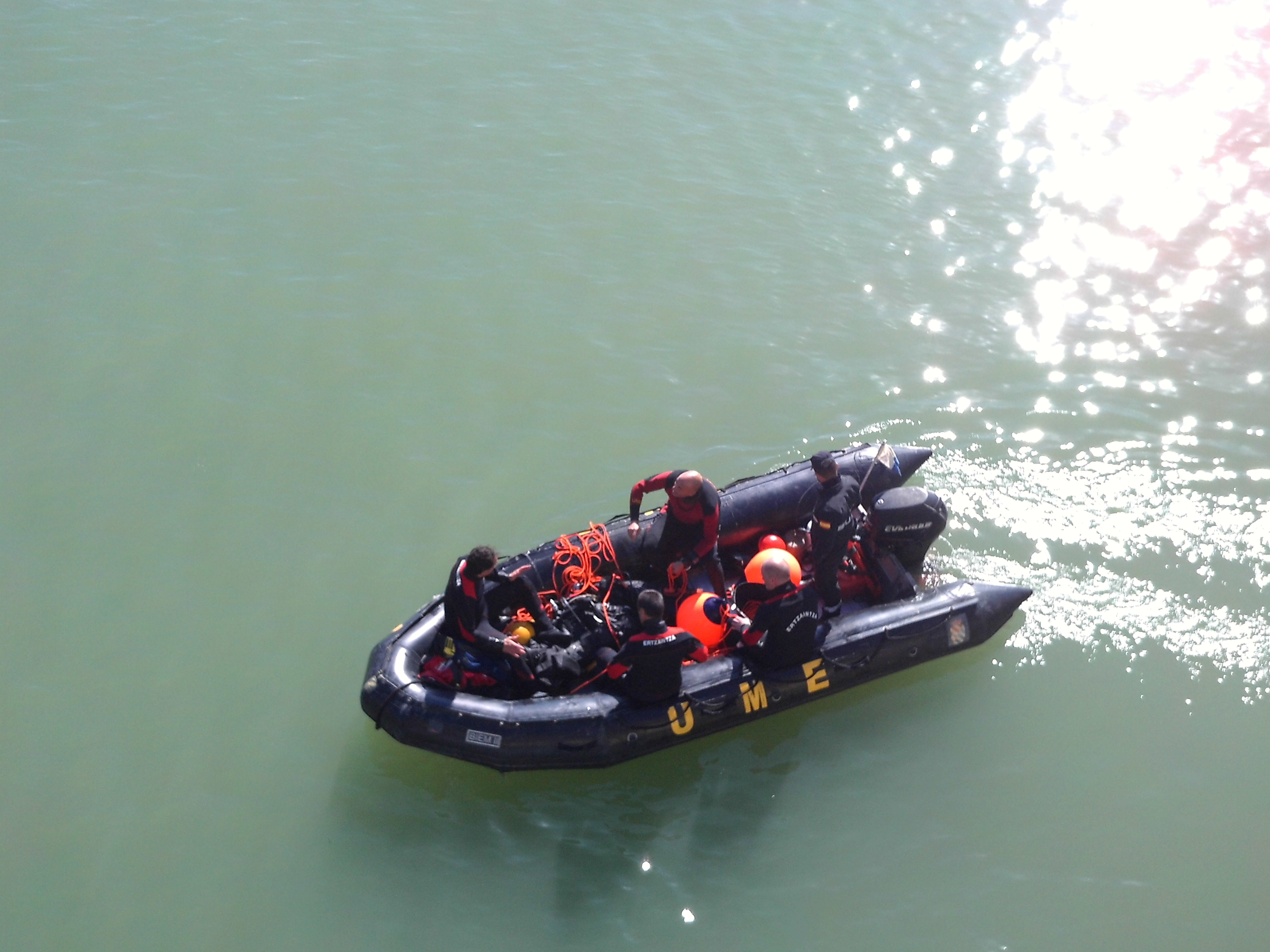
Zodiac IV of the Military Emergencies Unit

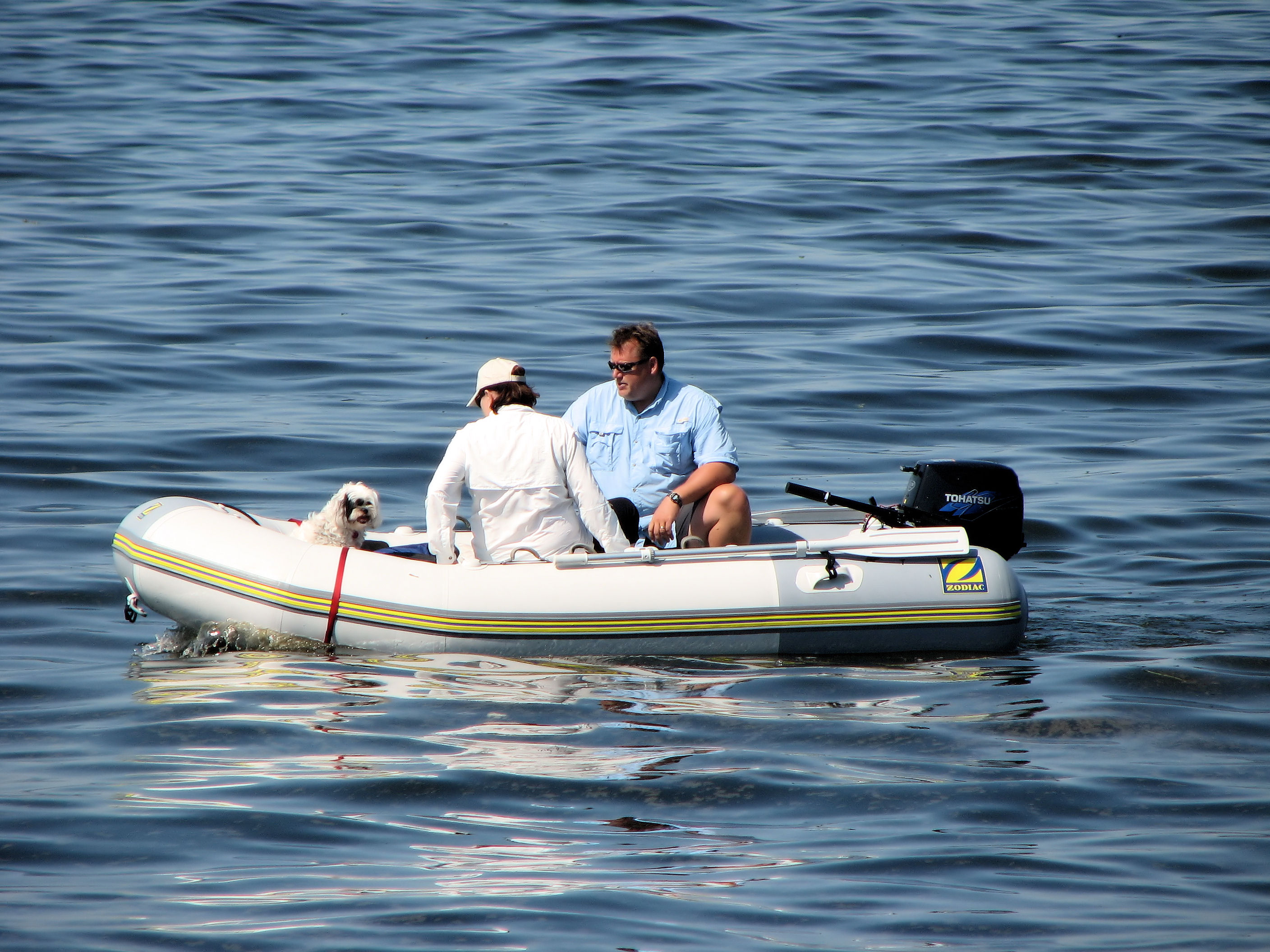
A deployed Zodiac boat

Zodiac Nautic, formerly Zodiac Marine & Pool, then Zodiac Marine, is a French company known for their inflatable boats. Originating as an airship company, the boating division was split off from the aerospace-focused Zodiac Group in 2007.

In France, "zodiac" has become a genericized trademark for an inflatable boat.

== History ==
=== Origins, and as part of the Zodiac Group ===
Zodiac originated with the Société française de ballons dirigeables et d’aviation Zodiac (Zodiac airships and aviation French company), which specialized in the production of airships. In the late 1930s, one of its engineers, Pierre Debroutelle, invented one of the first prototypes of inflatable boats. In 1937, the Aéronavale, the French Naval Air Force, commissioned several boats from Zodiac. The company started marketing to the general public in 1949. Zodiac received publicity in late 1952 after Alain Bombard made a crossing of the Atlantic in a production model of a Zodiac inflatable boat called L'Hérétique.

The company eventually stopped using materials for balloon production after the creation of synthetic nylon fabrics better suited for inflatable boats in the late 1950s.

Zodiac opened a temporary workshop in Courbevoie, expanded its already established factories and increased its workforce which allowed the company to begin producing 17 boats a day.

In the 1960s, the company turned to the leisure industry to accommodate vacationers. Zodiac boats were brought into the mainstream in the late 1960s as Jacques Cousteau equipped his Calypso with several of Zodiac's boats.

=== Zodiac Marine & Pool (2007–2012) ===
On September 28, 2007, the Zodiac Group and the American fund Carlyle Group announced the creation of Zodiac Marine & Pool, resulting from the merger of Zodiac's marine and pool division with the pool division of Water Pik Technologies, which includes Jandy Pool Products. The new entity is 69% owned by the Carlyle Group, 27% by Zodiac and 4% by the management team. The boating company, spun off from the Zodiac Group, leaves behind the aeronautics division Zodiac Aerospace, which was absorbed into Safran in 2018.

In 2010, Zodiac Marine & Pool sold its liferaft division S.O.L.A.S (Safety of Life at Sea), comprising its French subsidiary Zodiac Solas (now ZodiacSurvitec) and the Canadian company DBC Marine Safety Systems, to the British group Survitec.

At the end of 2012, the parent company Zodiac Marine & Pool split into three entities:

- Zodiac Marine, comprising the leisure marine activities sold to the turnaround fund OpenGate Capital;
- Zodiac Military and Professional (including the Finnish company EVAC), comprising the military and environmental marine activities sold to the Oaktree Capital fund;
- Zodiac Pool Solutions, comprising the pool equipment businesses retained by the Carlyle Group, and merged with Fluidra in 2017.

=== Zodiac Marine, then Zodiac Nautic (2012–) ===
After encountering financial troubles, Zodiac Marine, the boating company, was again sold to private owners in 2015. The 25-employee “Space” branch became Airstar Aerospace when it was taken over in 2015 by the French industrial group Airstar.

On July 1, 2015, the Nanterre Commercial Court ratified the takeover bid by Energetic Développement, headed by Dominique Heber-Suffrin, to take over Zodiac Marine. A new company is created, to be known as Z Nautic, under the trade name "Zodiac Nautic".

At the end of 2019, Pierre Bastid takes over the management of the company, replacing Dominique Heber-Suffrin, who leaves the company but remains a minority shareholder.
