= Oral care swab =

Sponge on a stick used for oral care

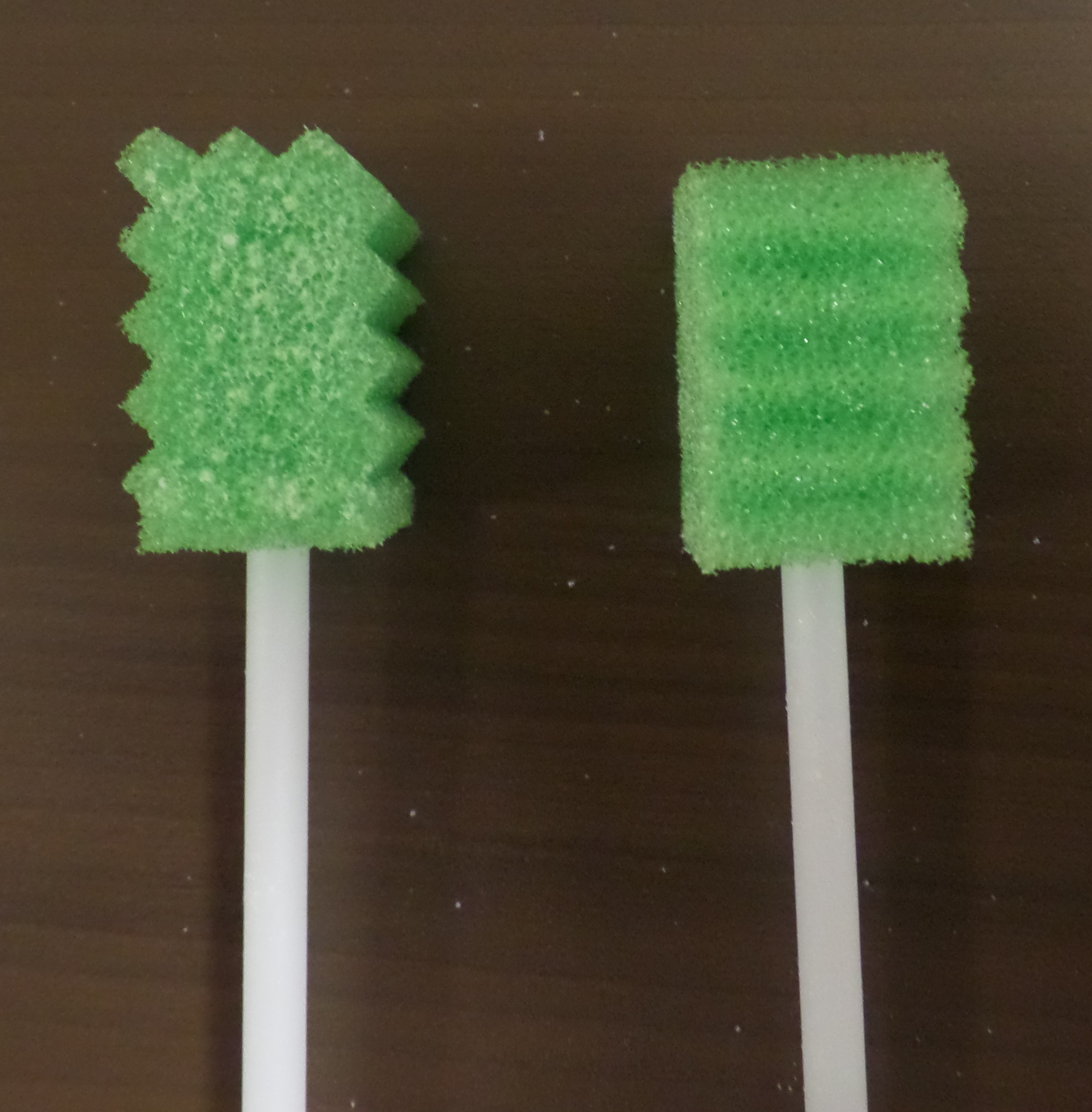
The two sides of a Toothette's sponge head

Oral care swabs are disposable, single-use oral care sponges attached to a stick. They are used for oral care in the hospital and long-term care setting. Disposable oral care swabs may also be known by other various names, such as sponge swab, swabs for oral care, foam swab, mouth swab, oral swabstick, and the trademark name Toothette.

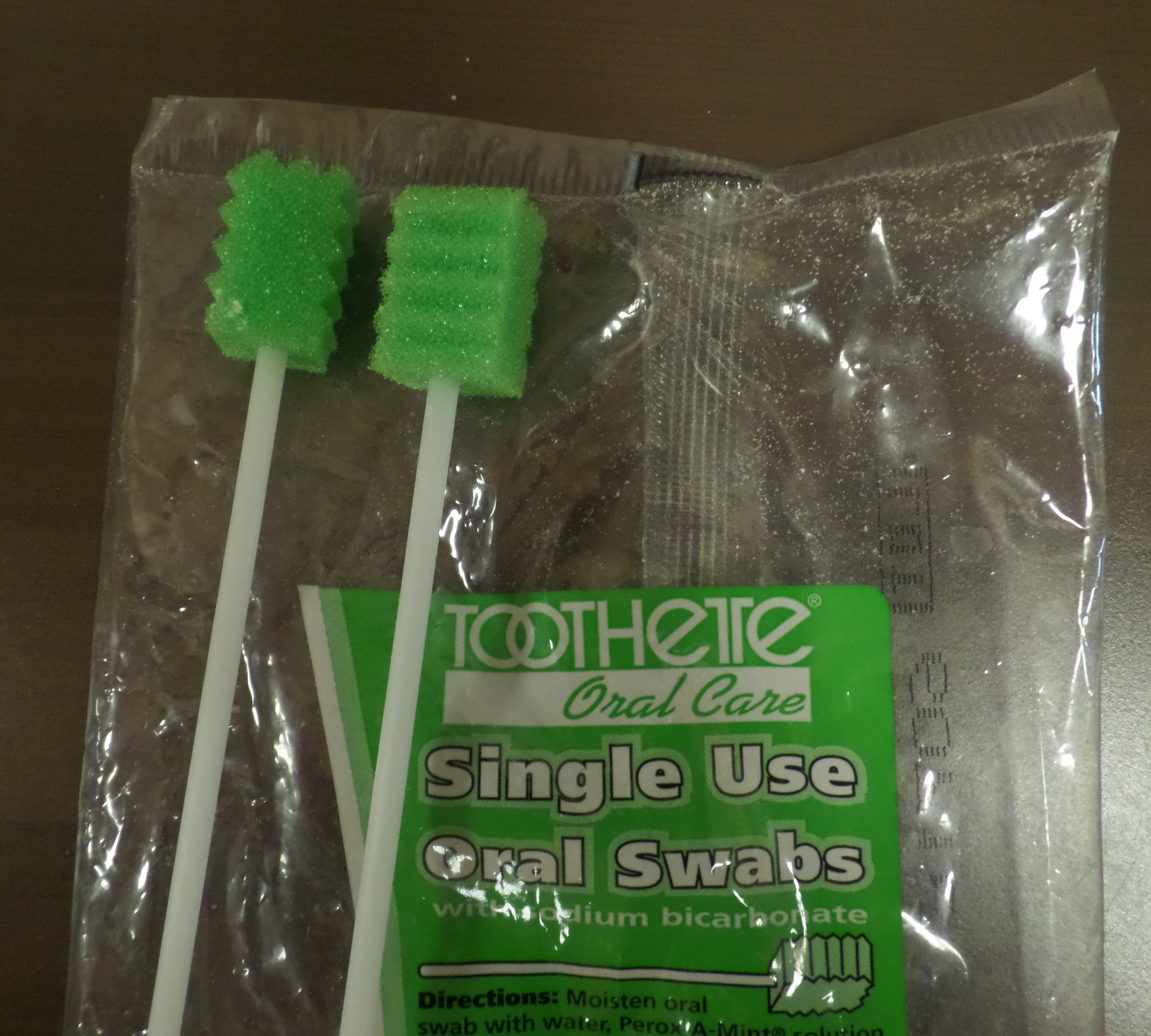
Two Toothettes and their packaging

== Intended use ==
The Toothette is meant to moisten and clear the oral cavity of food debris and thickened saliva associated with xerostomia (dry mouth). Most importantly, the oral care swab's intended use is as an adjunct to other oral care tools (toothbrush and interdental cleaners) in the hospital and long-term care setting. It is especially useful when caring for the oral health of intubated and palliative care patients, and is recommended for individuals who are receiving radiation therapy, chemotherapy, bone marrow transplants, or are immunosuppressed. The American Dental Association approved the Toothette Plus Oral Swab with Sodium Bicarbonate and the Toothette Oral Care Single Use System in May 2002, stating the "Toothette Oral Care Single Use System/Toothette Plus Oral Swab is accepted as an effective oral cleansing device for individuals who have difficulty practicing normal oral hygiene".

Oral swabs and other foam swabs are effective at stimulating the tissue between oral care, and are used for patients who are unable to care for their own oral health. Oral swabs are especially helpful when a patient suffers from gross mucositis, potentially arising from chemotherapy. This is because the oral swabs can apply moisture to the oral cavity, therefore soothing the tissues. Additionally, oral care swabs are indicated when toothbrushing is contraindicated, particularly when an individual's platelet counts are below 40,000–50,000 and when there are issues accessing the oral cavity. It is also necessary to use oral swabs for oral care when an individual has thrombocytopenia in order to reduce risk of exacerbated bleeding.

== Misuse ==
Often oral health education and training is limited for healthcare aids and nurses, leading to suboptimal oral care for dependent patients in long-term care and hospital settings. The oral care swab is inaccurately used in the long-term care and hospital setting as the predominant tool for oral care, and toothbrushes are rarely used Grap et al. found that nursing staff in an intensive care unit most commonly use oral care swabs and mouthwash as the predominant tool for oral care, especially for intubated patients. This is concerning because it is well-established that the oral care swab does not effectively remove oral biofilm, and the toothbrush is significantly better at promoting health of the gums and controlling oral biofilm. When the efficacy of the toothbrush and oral care swab are compared, the toothbrush is better at removing plaque from the oral cavity.

The current oral care practices of nursing staff in the long-term care and hospital setting do not reflect evidence-based recommendations present in the literature. The American Dental Association cautioned "[the oral care swab] does not substitute for daily brushing and flossing for effective plaque removal from teeth and, when possible, should be used in conjunction with brushing and flossing." Additionally, nursing mouth care policy for the Health Care Corporation of St. Johns reflects a similar perspective with a nursing alert stating: "Toothettes are not recommended as a substitute for a toothbrush". Dalhousie University's report, "Brushing up on mouth care: An oral health resource for those who provide care to older adults", further cautioned that the sponge end of oral care swabs does not have the ability to mechanical remove oral biofilm from the teeth and gums because it is too soft. They further elaborate on how the toothbrush performs significantly better in promoting healing of the gums, and state that "toothbrushes are safe and effective for removing debris and plaque from all oral tissues, including the tongue, palate, cheeks and teeth".

Effective oral biofilm control on a regular basis is a therapeutic intervention to reduce the risk of developing numerous systemic diseases, such as diabetes mellitus, cardiovascular disease, and aspiration pneumonia due to poor oral health. Therefore, it is essential that oral care policies of hospitals and long-term care settings discourage the use of oral care swabs as the sole tool for oral biofilm control. When used properly, toothbrushing and devices for interdental cleaning are well-established tools for regular plaque removal, and should be the predominant oral care tools used in the hospital and long-term care setting. The oral care swab can be used as an adjunct to toothbrushing and flossing to moisten and clear the oral cavity of food debris and thickened saliva associated with dry mouth.

== Health risks ==
Oral care swabs, when used improperly, pose significant health risks. They are a choking hazard because the sponge end can dislodge and be aspirated during use. On September 22, 2015, Health England Education Board banned sponge swabs from being used in the hospital and long-term care setting due to 800 safety incidents associated with their use, even causing the death of a patient in one case.

== Lemon glycerine swabs ==
Initially lemon glycerine swabs were used to aid in saliva production. However, it was noted that they caused irritation and enamel decalcification due to the acidity of the lemon. The combination of these factors lead to recurring dry mouth, counteracting the initial reason for its use. Due to their drying effect, the swabs were also ineffective in preventing dry lips. Therefore, the nursing mouth care policy for the Health Care Corporation of St. Johns recommended discontinuing use of lemon glycerine swabs for oral care due to its adverse effects. The evidence contraindicates the use of lemon glycerine swabstick for individuals suffering from dry mouth.
