= Water Pik =

American company based in Fort Collins, Colorado

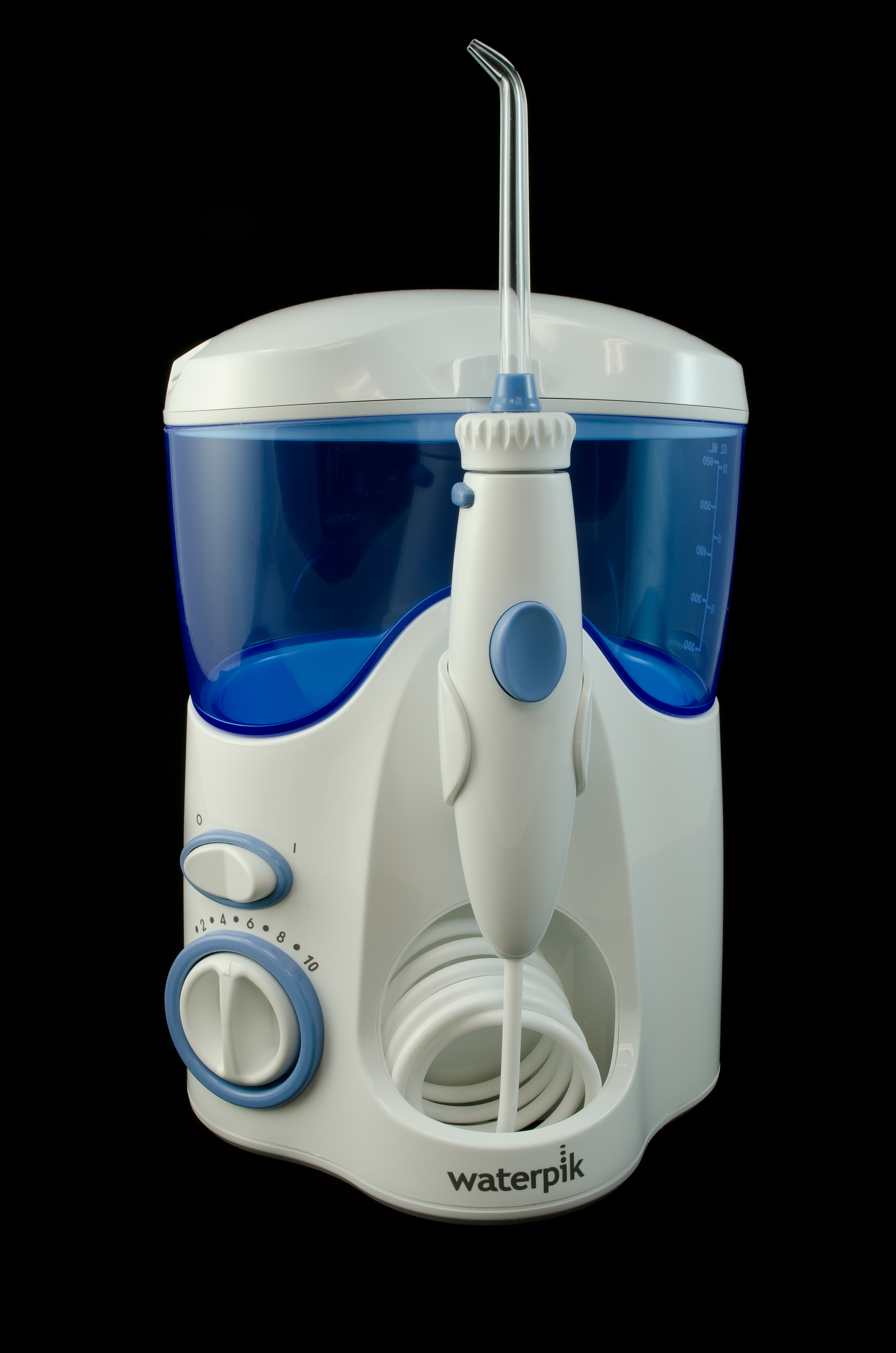
A Waterpik oral irrigator

Water Pik, Inc. (also Waterpik) is an American oral health products company that produces personal and oral health care products such as oral irrigators and pulsating shower heads. It is based in Fort Collins, Colorado, and is a subsidiary of Church & Dwight.

Until 2013, Water Pik Technologies, Inc. was a manufacturer of personal care products as well as swimming pool products, which it marketed under the Water Pik, Jandy and Air Energy brands. The pool products division, with the Jandy brand, was retained by the Carlyle Group within the "Pool Care" division of Zodiac Marine & Pool, now Zodiac Pool Solutions.

== History ==
Waterpik began in 1962 as Aqua Tec Corporation. with the invention of the oral irrigator. It was acquired by Teledyne Inc in 1967 and was spun off as a public company, Water Pik Technologies, in 1999.

It was then bought by the private equity firm Carlyle Group and French company Zodiac in 2006 in a deal valued at $380 million. At this point Water Pik had six major facilities in the US and Canada.

In 2007, Water Pik's pool equipment division was merged by the Carlyle Group and Zodiac with its marine and pool division to form a new entity called Zodiac Marine & Pool, headquartered in Paris, France.

In 2012, Water Pik was reported to have 1,400 employees. In 2013, Zodiac Marine & Pool (Carlyle Group) and EG Capital sold their stake in Water Pik (excluding the pool equipment division) to MidOcean Partners and Vulcan Capital.

In 2017, MidOcean agreed to sell the company for $1 billion to Church & Dwight. At the time of the sale announcement, it was reported that the company had "$265 million of revenue in the fiscal year ended June 30, about 70% of which came from its water flosser products".

== Products ==
Water Pik's product range developed from its original oral irrigator, introduced in the 1960s, and later expanded into showerheads, including the pulsating showerhead. The company also sold pool and spa products through brands such as Jandy and Laars, but those businesses were separated from the personal care lines before Water Pik's acquisition by Church & Dwight.

The company's best-known products are oral irrigators, commonly called water flossers, which use a pressurized stream of water for interdental cleaning. Its oral care line has also included electric toothbrushes and combination brushing-and-flossing devices such as the Sonic-Fusion series.

The company also continues to sell replacement showerheads under the Waterpik brand.
