= Maternal oral health =

Maternal oral health has been shown to affect the well-being of both the expectant mother and her unborn fetus.

== Importance of good oral hygiene for maternal health ==
The 2000 Surgeon's General Report stressed the interdependence of oral health on the overall health and well-being of an individual. Oral health is especially essential during perinatal period and the future development of the child. Proper management of oral health has benefits to both mother and child. Furthermore, lack of understanding or maintenance of good oral health for pregnant women may have adverse effects on them and their children. Hence, it is imperative to educate mothers regarding the significance of oral health. Moreover, collaboration and support among physicians across various fields, especially among family practitioners and obstetricians, is essential in addressing the concerns for maternal oral health. In 2007, the Maternal Oral Health Project was developed to provide routine oral care to low-income pregnant women in Nassau County, NY. Since its inception, the program has treated more than 2,000 pregnant women, many of whom had significant gum and/or tooth problems.

Oral health has numerous implications on overall general health and the quality of life of an individual. The Surgeon General's Report lists various systemic diseases and conditions that have oral manifestations. The oral cavity serves as both a site of and a gateway entry of disease for microbial infections, which can affect general health status. In addition, some studies have demonstrated a relationship between periodontal diseases and diabetes, cardiovascular disease, stroke, and adverse pregnancy outcomes. Furthermore, the report establishes a relationship between oral health and quality of life, including functional, psychosocial, and economic indicators. Poor oral health can affect diet, nutrition, sleep, psychological status, social interaction, school, and work.

== Physiological oral changes during pregnancy ==
Protection and control of oral health and diseases safeguards a woman's health and quality of life before and during pregnancy. Also, it has the potential to decrease the transmission of pathogenic bacteria that occurs from mother to child. Along with pregnancy, come physiological changes for a woman. The changes, including fluctuating hormones, increase the woman's susceptibility to oral infections such as periodontal disease. This disease impairs the body's ability to repair and maintain soft tissues. It also causes indirect damage through bacterial induction of both inflammatory and immune responses of the host. During pregnancy, mild inflammation of the gums, "pregnancy gingivitis", is quite common and if left untreated can lead to periodontal disease. There have been an increased number of studies establishing associations between, periodontal disease and negative health outcomes, which include tooth loss, cardiovascular disease, stroke, poor diabetes control, and adverse birth outcomes. For example, one such study found that moderate or severe periodontal disease early in pregnancy was associated with delivery of small-for-gestational-age infant. Other studies have also found an association between periodontal disease and development of pre-eclampsia and pre-term births. Another condition called a pyogenic granuloma can appear in the buccal mucosa or gingiva of the mother in the second or third trimester or pregnancy and this is believed to be due to fluctuations in the mother's estrogen or sex hormones.

== Maternal dental caries and its effects on child health ==
Another notable oral disease pertinent to maternal child health is dental caries. Dental caries is the process of tooth decay, and the development of what is commonly known as cavities. Dental caries are transmitted from mother to child vertically; colonization of cariogenic bacteria primarily occurs from mother to child through saliva-sharing activities. Maternal oral flora can ultimately foretell oral flora in offspring. In addition, other maternal factors such as social, behavioral, and biological factors can predispose a child's experience with tooth-decay. Some of these factors include the lack of knowledge a mother possesses concerning oral health, which can influence the development of caries among her children. Compared to children whose mothers have good oral health, children whose mothers have bad oral health are five times as likely to have poor oral health. Poor maintenance of oral health has profound implications on the development of children. As mentioned in the Surgeon's General Report, oral health affects the quality of life, especially children, with respect to functional, psychological, economic, and overall emotional well-being of an individual. To demonstrate the adverse effects of poor oral health, take for example the consequences a simple cavity can have on a child. First, it is painful. This might cause a child to miss school or have poor concentration, eventually compromising school performance. In addition, due to the pain, it might result in poor weight gain or growth. Also, children may exhibit reduced self-esteem because of cosmetic issues. Furthermore, it can affect language and impair speech. Impaired speech development can also result in low self-esteem. Finally, cavities although easily preventable, can pose a financial burden of a family. Public dental services are scarce and costly to individuals who lack dental insurance. It may also result in unwarranted visits to emergency department. Poor oral health permeates into other aspects of life, posing threats to overall well-being, if not handled timely and effectively

=== Factors for not seeking oral health services and how to overcome them ===
The significance of oral health is apparent, however, many women do not receive dental services before, during, and after pregnancy, even with obvious signs of oral disease. There are several factors at play regarding pregnant women not seeking dental care, including the role of the health care system and disposition of the woman herself. There is a common misconception that it is not safe to obtain dental services while pregnant. Many prenatal and oral health providers have limited knowledge about the impact and safety of delivering dental services; hence they might delay or withhold treatment during pregnancy. Moreover, some prenatal providers are not aware of the importance of oral health on overall general health, thus failing to refer their patients to dental providers. First and foremost, the misconception regarding the impact of dental services while a woman is pregnant needs to be purged. There is a consensus that prevention, diagnosis, and treatment of oral diseases are highly beneficial and can be performed on pregnant women having no added fetal or maternal risk when compared to the risk of providing no oral care. Equally important is establishing collaboration among clinicians, especially maternal health providers, with other dental providers. There should be coordination among general health and oral health providers, especially because of the interdependence of the two fields. Thus, it is imperative to educate and train health providers of the significance of oral health, designing methods to incorporate in their respective practices. Providers most provide education to pregnant women addressing the importance of oral health, because these women ultimately control the fate of themselves and their offspring. For example, providers can illustrate to mothers how to reduce cavities by wiping down the gums of their children with a soft cloth after breastfeeding or bottle-feeding. Bestowing knowledge and practical applications of good oral health maintenance measures to mothers can help improve overall health of the mother and child. There are still other factors in play when analyzing the low use of dental services by pregnant women, particularly prevalent among ethnic and racial minorities. A major factor is the lack of insurance and or access to dental services. Current studies analyzing difference in dental health and hygiene in women with and without insurance is limited to one or a few states. For this reason, more data needs to be collected and analyzed so that programs are set up to effectively to reach all segments of the population.}

== Treatments that can be performed during pregnancy ==
It is important to avoid dental treatment in the first trimester of pregnancy as this is when the process of organogenesis is occurring but it is advised to seek care urgently especially if a tooth extraction or root canal treatment is indicated.
