= Dental floss =

Cord used in interdental cleaning

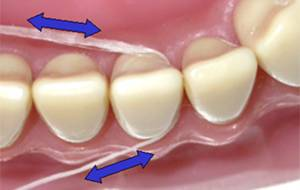
A picture demonstrating the use of floss to remove dental plaque between the teeth

Dental floss is a cord of thin filaments, typically made of nylon or silk, used in interdental cleaning to remove food and dental plaque from between teeth or places a toothbrush has difficulty reaching or is unable to reach. Its regular use as part of oral cleaning is intended to maintain oral health.

Use of floss is recommended to prevent gingivitis and the build-up of plaque. The American Dental Association claims that up to 80% of plaque can be removed by flossing, and it may confer a particular benefit in individuals with orthodontic devices. However, empirical scientific evidence demonstrating the clinical benefit of flossing as an adjunct to routine tooth brushing alone remains limited.

== History ==
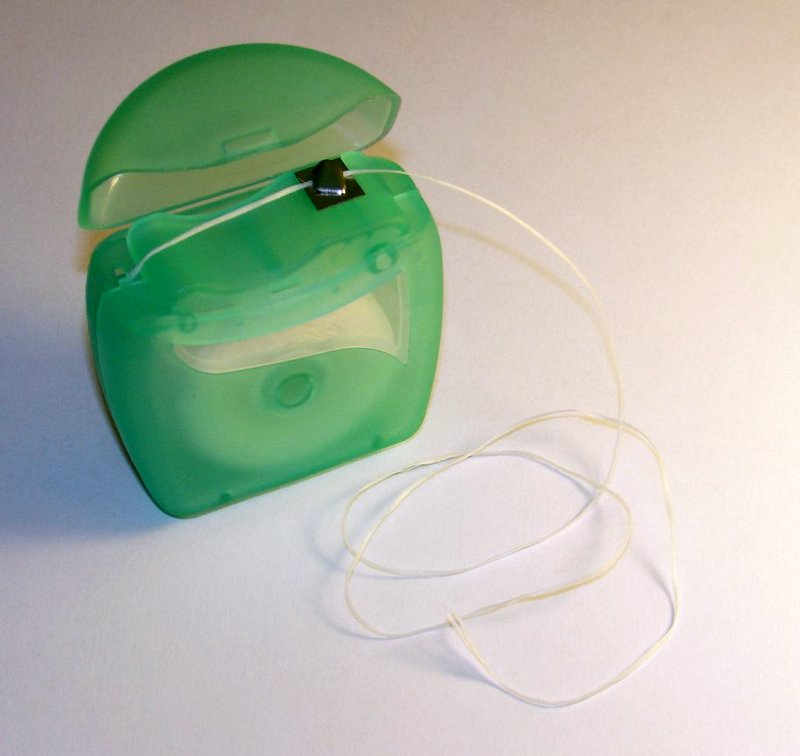
Dental floss (waxed)

Levi Spear Parmly (1790–1859), a dentist from New Orleans, is credited with inventing the first form of dental floss. In 1819, he recommended running a waxed silk thread "through the interstices of the teeth, between their necks and the arches of the gum, to dislodge that irritating matter which no brush can remove and which is the real source of disease." He considered this the most important part of oral care. Floss was not commercially available until 1882, when the Codman and Shurtleft company started producing unwaxed silk floss. In 1898, the Johnson & Johnson Corporation received the first patent for dental floss that was made from the same silk material used by doctors for silk stitches.

One of the earliest depictions of the use of dental floss in literary fiction is found in James Joyce's famous novel Ulysses (serialized 1918–1920), but the adoption of floss was low before World War II. During the war, nylon floss was developed by physician Charles C. Bass. Nylon floss was found to be better than silk because of its greater abrasion resistance and ability to be produced in great lengths and at various sizes.

Floss became part of American and Canadian daily personal dental care routines in the 1970s.

== Use ==
Dental professionals recommend that a person floss once per day before or after brushing to reach the areas that the brush will not and allow the fluoride from the toothpaste to reach between the teeth. Floss is commonly supplied in plastic dispensers that contain 10 to 100 meters (33–330 ft) of floss. After pulling out approximately 40 cm (16 in) of floss, the user pulls it against a blade in the dispenser to cut it off. The user then strings the piece of floss on a fork-like instrument, or holds it between their fingers using both hands with about 1–2 cm (1/2–1 in) of floss exposed. The user guides the floss between each pair of teeth and gently curves it against the side of the tooth in a 'C' shape and guides it under the gumline. This removes particles of food stuck between teeth and dental plaque that adheres to dental surfaces below the gumline.

== Types ==
Various dental flosses are commonly used in many forms, including waxed, unwaxed monofilaments and multifilaments. Dental floss that is made of monofilaments coated in wax slides easily between teeth, does not fray and is generally higher in cost than its uncoated counterparts. The most important difference between available dental flosses is thickness. Waxed and unwaxed floss are available in varying widths. Studies have shown that there is no difference in the effectiveness of waxed and unwaxed dental floss, but some waxed types of dental floss are said to contain antibacterial agents and/or sodium fluoride. Factors to consider in choosing a floss include the amount of space between teeth and user preference. Dental tape is a type of floss that is wider and flatter than conventional floss. Dental tape is recommended for people with larger tooth surface area.

The ability of different types of dental floss to remove dental plaque does not vary significantly; the least expensive floss has essentially the same impact on oral hygiene as the most expensive.

Factors to be considered when choosing the right floss or whether the use of floss as an interdental cleaning device is appropriate may be based on:

- The tightness of the contact area: determines the width of floss
- The contour of the gingival tissue
- The roughness of the interproximal surface
- The user's manual dexterity and preference: to determine if a supplemental device is required

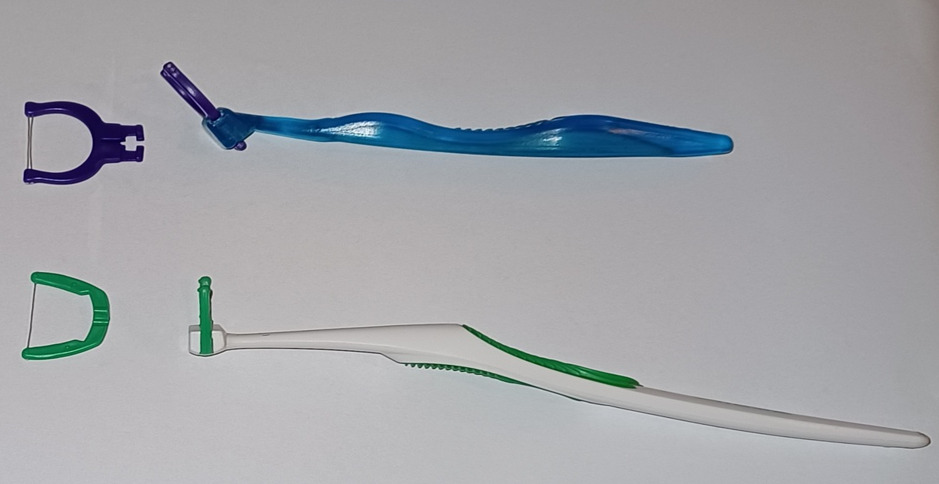
left: floss molded in disposable prongs, top: 135° handle, bottom: 90° handle

Specialized plastic wands, or floss picks, have been produced to hold the floss. These may be attached to or separate from a floss dispenser. While wands do not pinch fingers like regular floss can, using a wand may be awkward and can also make it difficult to floss at all the angles possible with regular floss. These types of flossers also run the risk of missing the area under the gum line that needs to be flossed. On the other hand, the enhanced reach of a wand can make flossing the back teeth easier.

Dental floss is the most frequently recommended cleaning aid for teeth sides with a normal gingiva contour in which the spaces between teeth are tight and small. The dental term 'embrasure space' describes the size of the triangular-shaped space immediately under the contact point of two teeth. The size of the embrasure space is useful in selecting the most appropriate interdental cleaning aid. There are three interproximal embrasure types or classes as described below:

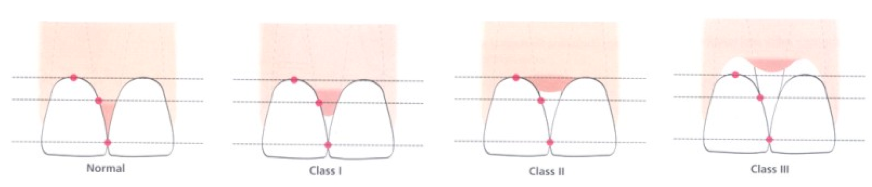
The classification of the amount of gum that fills the spaces between the teeth

- Type I – the gums fills embrasure space completely
- Type II – the gums partially fills embrasure space
- Type III – the gums do not fill embrasure space

The tables below describes the types of interdental self-care products available, non-powered and powered, respectively.

Types of non-powered interdental self-care products
Product	Description	Indications	Contraindications and limitations	Common problems experienced during misuse of product	No. uses / duration of use
Waxed floss	Traditional string floss, Nylon waxed Monofilament floss also available coated in polytetrafluoroethylene (PTFE), Does not fray	Type I embrasures, Floss cleans between the gum and tooth	Type II and III embrasures	Floss cuts, Floss clefts, Circulation to fingers may cut off from wrapping floss too tight, Inability to reach back teeth due to spacing and dexterity difficulties	One time use. Dispose after use
Unwaxed floss	Traditional string floss, Unwaxed, multifilaments	Type I embrasures, Floss cleans between the gum and tooth	Type II and III embrasures	See waxed floss	One time use. Dispose after use
Dental tape	Waxed floss that has a wider and flatter design to conventional floss	Type I embrasures, Floss cleans between the gum and tooth that may have large tooth surface area	Type II and III embrasures	See waxed floss	One time use. Dispose after use
Tufted/braided dental floss/ Superfloss	Regular diameter floss, wider tufted portion looks like yarn. Tip of product also resembles a threader	Type II and III embrasures. Under pontics of fixed partial dentures	Type I embrasures	Trauma from forcing threader into tissues. Yarnlike portion/fibers may catch on appliances or dental work (which may cause gum irritation/problem)	One time use. Dispose after use
Continuous floss holder	Handle with two prongs in Y or F shape	Type I embrasures. Recommended where spacing or gag reflexes make finger-held flossing difficult. Floss holders may assist caregivers	Type II and III embrasures	Unable to maintain tension of floss against tooth and fully wrap around tooth side. Need to set a fulcrum/finger rest (e.g. cheek, chin) to avoid trauma to gums and floss cuts. Varied designs offer varied ease in repositioning floss.	Can be used a number of times; long continuous floss is repositioned after each use.
Molded floss holder – two-piece	Handle with separable prongs in Y shape	Type I embrasures. Recommended where spacing or gag reflexes make finger-held flossing difficult. Floss holders may assist caregivers	Type II and III embrasures	Eases positioning and moving floss with tension, in tight spaces, and improves visibility.	Handle is reused indefinitely. Prongs and molded-in floss are changed after each use, or when frayed.
Molded floss holder – one-piece	Small handle with prongs in Y or F shape	Type I embrasures. Recommended where spacing or gag reflexes make finger-held flossing difficult. Floss holders may assist caregivers	Type II and III embrasures	Eases positioning and moving floss with tension, in tight spaces, and improves visibility.	Pronged handle and molded-in floss are changed after each use, or when frayed.
Floss threader	A nylon loop designed to resemble a needle with large opening to thread floss. Tip of floss threader inserted and pulled through the space between two teeth to allow cleaning of the teeth sides	Type I embrasures: tight contacts between teeth, floss between and under abutment teeth and pontics of fixed prosthesis (e.g. fixed bridges and dental implants), under orthodontic appliances such as wires and lingual bar, under bars for implants	Type II and III embrasures	Trauma to gums from flossing threader into tissues	Can be used a number of times, however floss is to be changed after each use
Threader-tip floss	A length of floss with an attached threader tip	Type I embrasures, Floss cleans between the gum and tooth	Type II and III embrasures	See waxed floss	One time use. Dispose after use

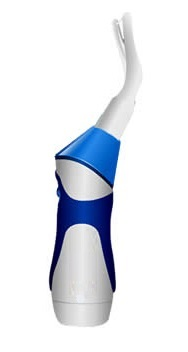
Powered flosser

Types of powered interdental self-care products
Product	Description	Indications	Contraindications and limitations	Common problems experienced during misuse of product
Power flossers	Bow type tip and single filament nylon tip	Type I embrasures: Individuals with physical challenges. Individuals who cannot master traditional string floss. Individual preference.	Type II and III embrasures. Tight contacts between teeth or crowded teeth	Floss cuts or clefts with floss holder designs. Unable to maintain tension or wrap floss completely around tooth side.

== Efficacy ==
=== Evidence ===
The American Dental Association has stated that flossing in combination with brushing of teeth can help prevent gum disease and halitosis. The ADA considers it acceptable to floss either before or after brushing the teeth.

A 2006 review of 6 studies in which professionals flossed the teeth of school children over a period of 1.7 years showed a 40% reduction in the risk of tooth decay.

However, evidence favoring commonplace use of floss remains limited. A 2008 systematic review concluded that adjunct flossing was no more effective than tooth brushing alone in reducing plaque or gingivitis. The authors concluded that routine instruction of flossing in gingivitis patients as helpful adjunct therapy is not supported by scientific evidence, and that flossing recommendations should be made by dental professionals on an individual basis.

A 2011 Cochrane Database systematic review identified "some evidence from 12 studies that flossing in addition to tooth brushing reduces gingivitis compared to tooth brushing alone", and "weak, very unreliable evidence from 10 studies that flossing plus tooth brushing may be associated with a small reduction in plaque at 1 and 3 months." Studies of flossing behavior are based on self-report and many people do not floss properly.

More recently, a 2019 Cochrane Database systematic review compared toothbrushing alone to interdental cleaning devices, and also compared flossing to other interdental cleaning methods. In all, 35 randomized control trials met the criteria for inclusion, with all but 2 studies at high risk for performance bias. The authors concluded that "overall, the evidence was low to very low certainty, and the effect sizes observed may not be clinically important."

As many authors note, the efficacy of flossing may be highly variable based on individual preference, technique, and motivation. Moreover, flossing may be a relatively more difficult and tedious method of interdental cleaning compared to an interdental brush.

=== Exclusion from US Dietary Guidelines in 2015 ===
There was a controversy when the 2015 United States Dietary Guidelines for Americans did not include a recommendation about flossing. The US Department of Health and Human Services and the US Department of Agriculture publish Dietary Guidelines for Americans every five years. Guidelines published in 2000, 2005 and 2010 recommended flossing as part of a combined approach to preventing dental diseases.

In August 2016, an Associated Press (AP) article titled "Medical benefits of dental floss unproven" reported on the omission of flossing from the 2015 document. The article tied the omission to the AP's Freedom of Information Request to the departments of Health and Human Services and Agriculture where it asked for the scientific evidence behind the Guidelines' flossing recommendation noting that "The guidelines must be based on scientific evidence, under the law." The story was picked up by other news organizations including The New York Times in an article entitled "Feeling Guilty About Not Flossing? Maybe There's No Need".

The American Dental Association contacted the US Department of Health and Human Services about the omission and reported that the omission of the flossing recommendation was due to the fact that the Dietary Guidelines chose to focus on diet and that the omission was not because the Department questions the efficacy of flossing. As reported by Medscape,

An HHS spokesperson explained in an e-mailed statement that "since neither the 2010 nor 2015 Advisory Committees reviewed evidence on brushing and flossing teeth, the authors of the current edition decided not to carry forward the information on brushing and flossing included in past editions of the guidelines. By doing so, they were not implying that this is not an important oral hygiene practice. It is also important to note that, although dental floss was mentioned in past editions of the Guidelines, it was most likely identified as a supporting recommendation along with brushing teeth, with the primary emphasis being on the nutrition-based recommendation to reduce added sugars." The 2010 guidelines mention flossing only once, as one of the components of an oral health regimen.

A website managed by a maker of dental floss referred to the entire episode as "Flossgate".

=== Floss for orthodontic appliances ===
Orthodontic appliances, such as brackets, wires, and bands, can harbor plaque with more virulent changes in bacterial composition, which can ultimately cause a reduction in periodontal health as indicated by increased gingival recession, bleeding on probing, and plaque retention measurements. Furthermore, fixed appliances makes plaque control more challenging and restricts the natural cleaning action of the tongue, lips, and cheek to remove food and bacterial debris from tooth surfaces, and also creates new plaque stagnation areas that stimulate the colonisation of pathogenic bacteria.

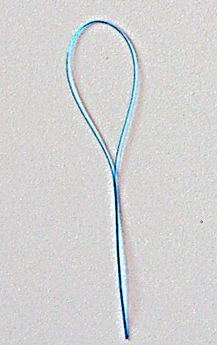
Floss threader

Patients undergoing orthodontic treatment may be recommended to maintain a high level of plaque control through not only conscientious toothbrushing, but also proximal surface cleaning via interdental aids, with dental floss being the most recommended by dental professionals. Small-scale clinical studies have demonstrated that dental floss, when used correctly, may lead to clinically significant improvements in proximal gingival health.

== Floss threader ==
A floss threader is loop of fiber that is shaped in order to produce better handling characteristics. It is (similar to fishing line) used to thread floss into small, hard to reach sites around teeth. Threaders are sometimes required to floss with dental braces, fix retainers, and bridge.

== Floss pick ==
Floss pick shapes

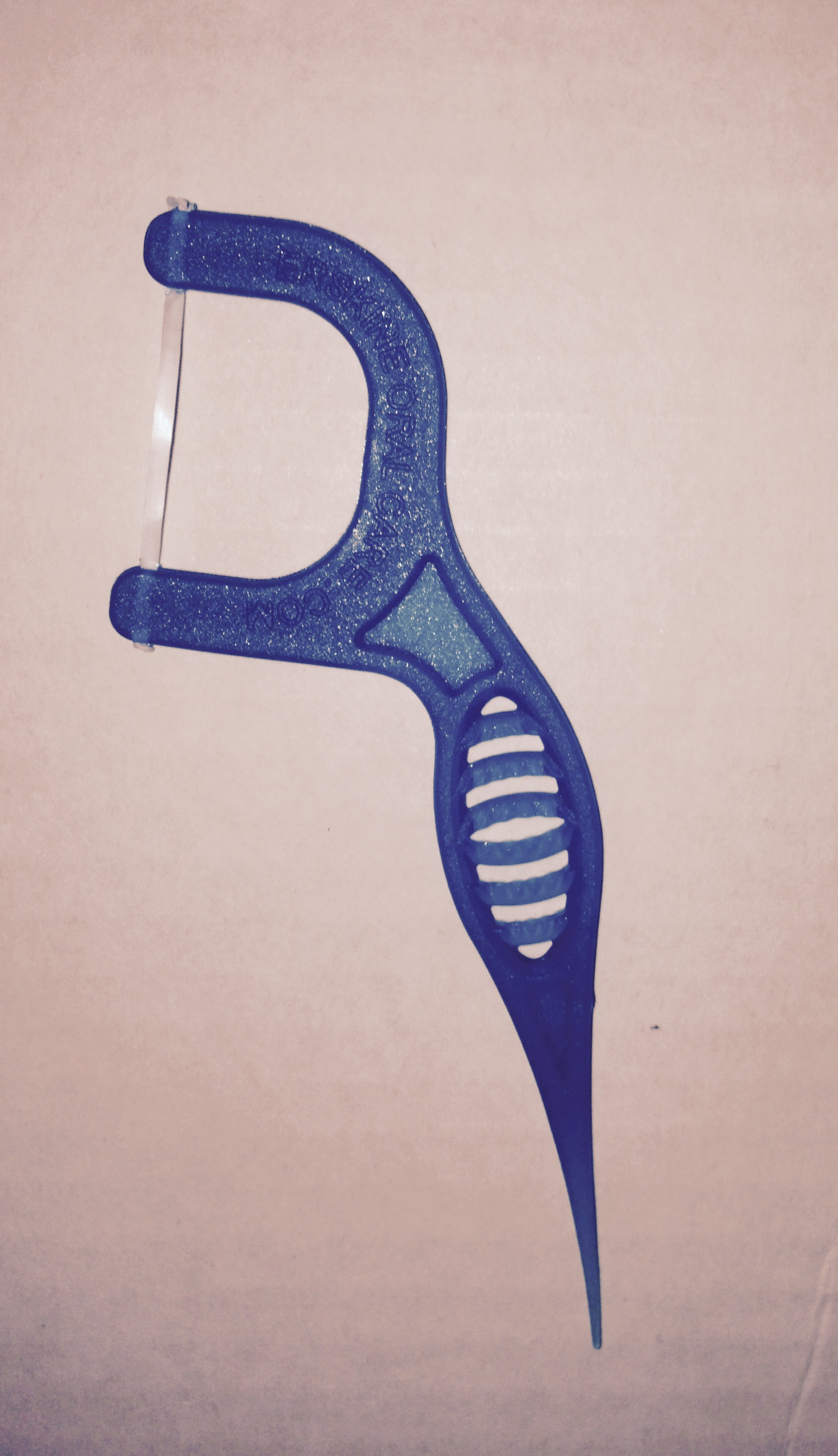
F-shaped

A floss pick is a disposable oral hygiene device generally made of plastic and dental floss. The instrument is composed of two prongs extending from a thin plastic body of high-impact polystyrene material. A single piece of floss runs between the two prongs. The body of the floss pick generally tapers at its end in the shape of a toothpick. There are two types of angled floss picks in the oral care industry, the Y-shaped angle and the F-shaped angle floss pick. At the base of the arch where the "Y" begins to branch there is a handle for gripping and maneuvering before it tapers off into a pick.

Floss picks are manufactured in a variety of shapes, colors and sizes for adults and children. The floss can be coated in fluoride, flavor or wax.

=== History of floss pick ===
In 1888, B. T. Mason wrapped a fibrous material around a toothpick and dubbed it the "combination tooth pick". In 1916, J. P. De L'eau invented a dental floss holder between two vertical poles. In 1935, F. H. Doner invented what today's consumer knows as the Y-shaped angled dental appliance. In 1963, James B. Kirby invented a tooth-cleaning device that resembles an archaic version of today's F-shaped floss pick.

In 1972, an inventor named Richard L. Wells found a way to attach floss to a single pick end. In the same year, another inventor named Harry Selig Katz came up with a method of making a disposable dental floss tooth pick.

== In nature ==
A Japanese macaque and long-tailed macaques have been observed in the wild and in captivity flossing with human hair and feathers.

== See also ==
- Oral irrigator (water flosser)
- Tongue cleaner
- Chlorhexidine
- Mouthwash
- Xylitol
- Sugar-free gum
- Electric toothbrush
