= Oral irrigator =

Dental care device

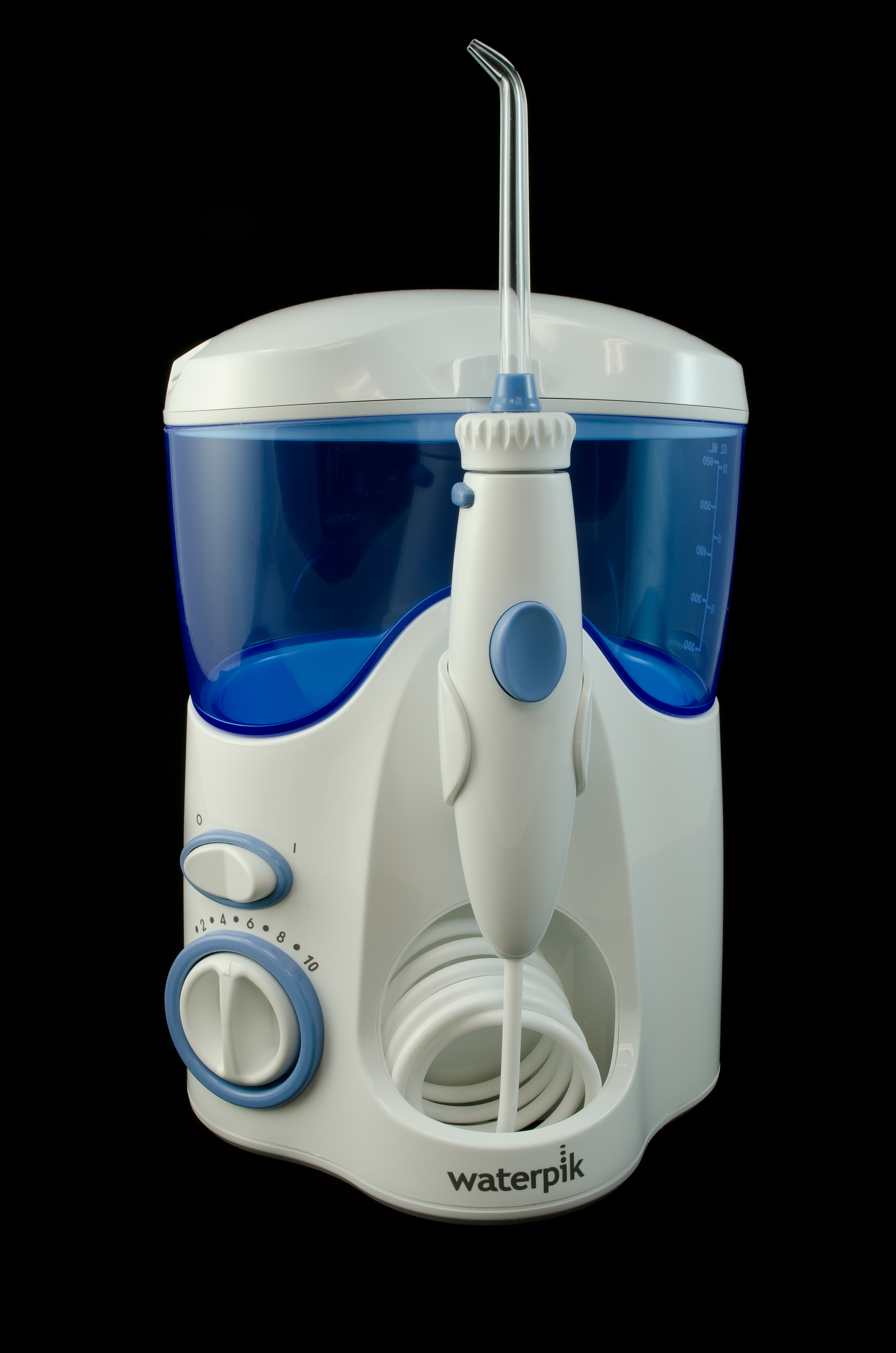
- An oral irrigator
- Other names: Dental water jet; Water flosser
- Specialty: Dentistry, dental hygiene
- Uses: Removal of dental plaque and food debris; improvement of gingival health
- Types: Countertop; Cordless/Portable; Faucet-attached
- MeSH: D003754

An oral irrigator (also called a dental water jet, water flosser or, by the brand name of the best-known such device, Waterpik) is a home dental care device which uses a stream of high-pressure pulsating water intended to remove dental plaque and food debris between teeth and below the gum line. Regular use of an oral irrigator is believed to improve gingival health. The devices may also provide easier cleaning for braces and dental implants. However, more research is needed to confirm plaque biofilm removal and effectiveness when used by patients with special oral or systemic health needs.

== History ==
The first oral irrigator was developed in the 1950s by Dr. C.D. Matteson, who patented the invention in 1955. Dr. Matteson's invention was designed to cleanse the teeth and gums after meals as an alternative to using hand syringes. It attached directly to a sink's faucet and featured a mechanical valve to control water pressure.

Later, in 1962, dentist Gerald Moyer and engineer John Mattingly invented Waterpik. The Waterpik featured a built in reservoir and motor to pump water out of a tip at rhythmic pulses. The Waterpik is now sold by Water Pik, Inc.

The oral irrigator was invented in 1962 by dentist Dr. Gerald Moyer and engineer John Mattingly in Fort Collins, Colorado, who founded Aqua Tec to develop a device delivering pulsating water flow for interdental cleaning. The company was later rebranded as Waterpik, which introduced the first countertop model in 1967 and has remained the dominant manufacturer for over six decades. Early devices were limited to stationary countertop units with electrical cords, while contemporary models include cordless portable units with rechargeable batteries, multiple pressure settings, and specialized tips for orthodontic patients and implants.

Clinical research has evolved alongside technological improvements. A 2023 randomized controlled trial demonstrated that water flossing significantly reduces gingival bleeding and inflammation compared to dental floss, with whole mouth bleeding on probing reduced by 0.41 versus 0.19 for string floss after four weeks. The device operates through pulsating water streams creating hydrokinetic activity, including an impact zone at the gingival margin and a flushing zone reaching subgingival areas to remove bacteria. Modern classifications include traditional countertop, portable battery-powered, and smart technology-enabled models, with pressure settings ranging from gentle modes for sensitive tissue to higher pressures for orthodontic hardware.

== Efficacy ==
Oral irrigators have been evaluated in a number of scientific studies and have been tested for periodontal maintenance, and those with gingivitis, diabetes, orthodontic appliances, and tooth replacements such as crowns, and implants.

A 2008 systematic review found improvement in gingival health with irrigation compared with regular oral hygiene, although there was no reduction in plaque. A 2019 meta-analysis found that water-jet irrigation is more effective at reducing bleeding on probing than flossing.

== Other uses ==
Oral irrigators have also been used to remove tonsil stones ("tonsiloliths") in those subject to them.

== Mode of operation ==
Most oral irrigators use a single stream of water to flush unwanted material from between the teeth. Compared to flossing, oral irrigators are also ideal for narrow teeth or hard-to-reach areas between teeth.

The market also offers devices in which it is possible to specifically massage the gums using sophisticated massage heads. In addition, mouthwash solution can be injected into periodontal pockets using the sub-gingival nozzle, used as a nozzle.

== Cleaning technique ==
After filling the reservoir with water, point the nozzle close to the gum line at an angle of 90 degrees. Then start the device by setting the appropriate pressure value. It is recommended to start irrigation from the back teeth, slowly following the gum line. The water jet should be directed between the tooth spaces, surfaces above the gum line, stopping momentarily at the area to be cleaned. In the case of hard-to-reach areas such as when using braces, in gum pockets, the angle of the nozzle can be changed.

== Criticism ==
Some dentists classify the oral irrigator as a wellness product, because it is not a substitute for routine brushing and flossing. There is only a possible improvement in blood circulation in the gums due to the massage effect. On the other hand, there is a risk that food debris will get into the tooth pockets due to improper use ("flushing the tooth pockets") and damage the teeth and gums there. Because of this risk, most dentists do not recommend the use of oral irrigators. Many dentists advise against usage of an irrigator for people with gum disease or who have had a tooth extraction.

== See also ==
- Dental floss
