= Fluidra =

Spanish pool manufacturer

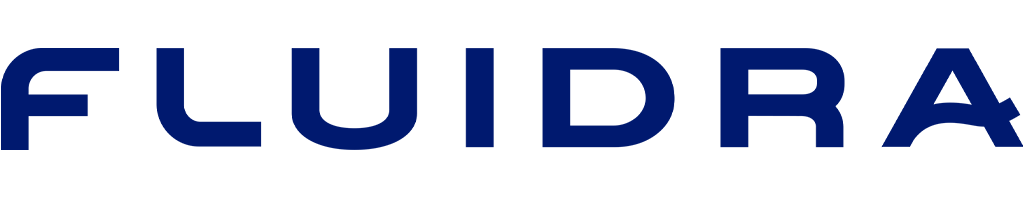
- Company type: Sociedad Anónima
- Traded as: BMAD: FDR
- ISIN: ES0137650018
- Industry: Swimming pool and wellness equipment manufacturer
- Founded: 1969
- Headquarters: Barcelona, Spain
- Key people: Eloi Planes (Chairman); Bruce W. Brooks (CEO)
- Revenue: ▲€1.525 billion (2020)
- Operating income: ▲€184.063 million (2020)
- Total assets: ▼€2.805 billion (2020)
- Total equity: €195.629 million (2020)
- Number of employees: ▲5,500 (2020)
- Website: www.fluidra.com

Fluidra is a Spanish pool manufacturer currently part of the IBEX 35, the benchmark index of the Bolsa de Madrid, Spain's largest stock exchange.

== History ==
Fluidra was founded in 1969 in Barcelona, Spain by four families (Planes, Serra, Corbera and Garrigós), creating the first company called Astral Construcciones Metálicas. Joan Planes Vila was the founder; he died on 23 January 2025, at the age of 83.

Over the years, Fluidra has become an international company with around 6,000 employees working in production centres and sales offices located in more than 45 countries in Europe, North America, Australia, Asia, and Africa.

Fluidra's executive president is Eloi Planes and the CEO is Bruce Brooks.

The company went public on the Spanish stock exchange in 2007.

In November 2017, Fluidra announced its merger with the Zodiac, which would be completed in July 2018.

At the end of 2021, Fluidra's turnover reached €2.2 billion with an EBITDA margin of 25%.

In March 2021, Fluidra was included in the IBEX 35.

During the 2022 Russian invasion of Ukraine, Fluidra did not withdraw from the Russian market. Research from Yale University published on 10 August 2022, identifying how companies were reacting to Russia's invasion identified Fluidra in the "Digging in" category: companies continuing to do business in the country as usual. As of 2023, it was attempting to sell its Russian subsidiaries, but continuing to do business in Russia in the meantime.

On 20 May 2024, Fluidra announced the appointment of Jaime Ramirez as Chief Executive Officer.

== Business lines ==
Fluidra works in the pool and wellness sector, manufacturing and distributing equipment to build, upgrade and maintain a swimming pool, i.e. filtration, pumping, disinfection and water treatment, LED lighting, heating, cladding, as well as ornamental elements, together with connected applications (APPs) that allow remote control of the installation.
