= Oral hygiene =

Health habits involving the oral cavity

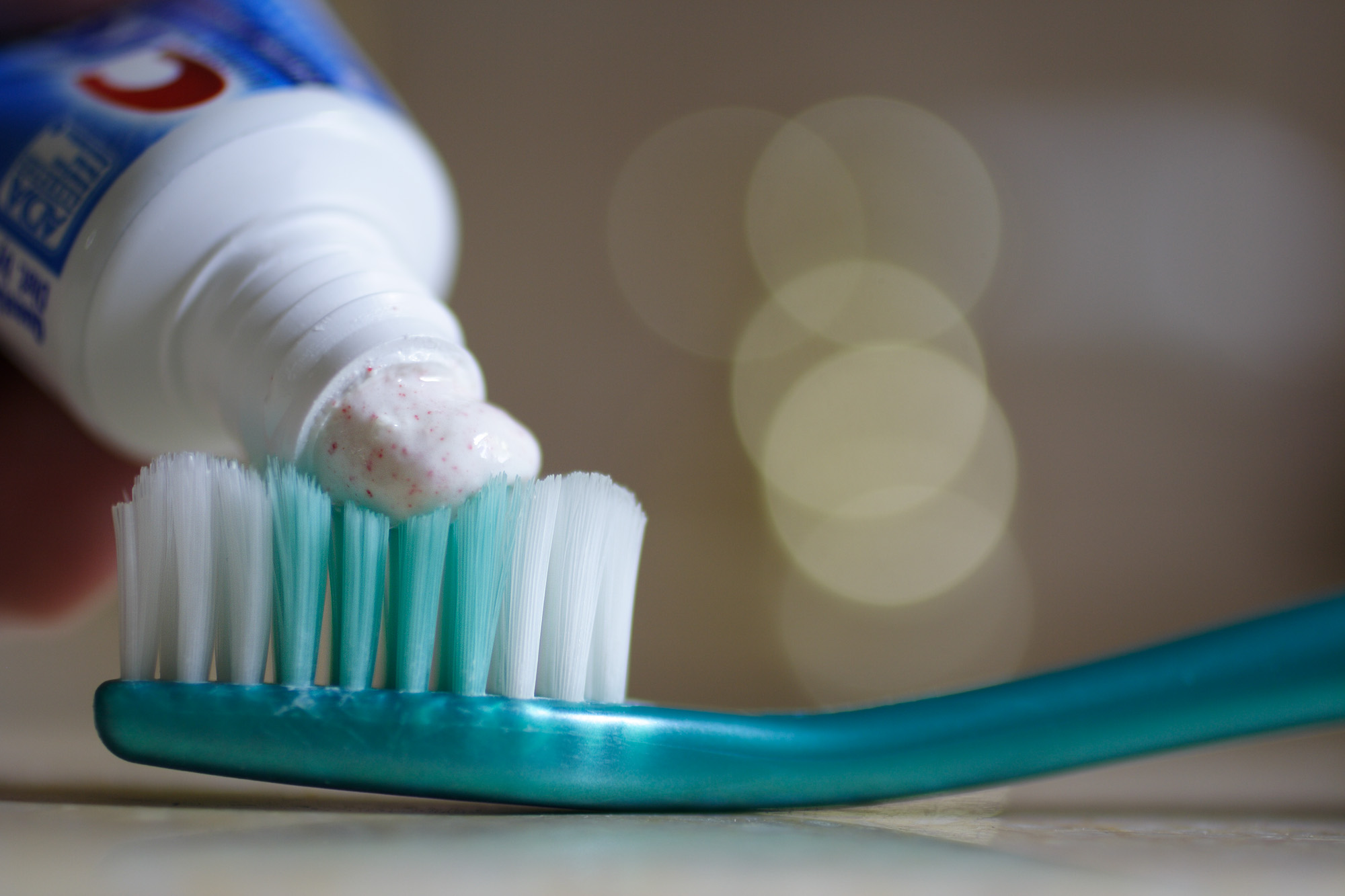
Proper oral hygiene requires regular brushing and interdental cleaning.

Oral hygiene is the practice of keeping one's oral cavity clean and free of disease and other problems (e.g. bad breath) by regular brushing of the teeth (dental hygiene) and adopting good hygiene habits. It is important that oral hygiene be carried out on a regular basis to enable prevention of dental disease and bad breath. The most common types of dental disease are tooth decay (cavities, dental caries) and gum diseases, including gingivitis, and periodontitis.

General guidelines for adults suggest brushing at least twice a day with a fluoridated toothpaste: brushing before going to sleep at night and after breakfast in the morning. Cleaning between the teeth is called interdental cleaning and is as important as tooth brushing. This is because a toothbrush cannot reach between the teeth and therefore only removes about 50% of plaque from the surface of the teeth. There are many tools available for interdental cleaning which include floss, tape and interdental brushes; it is up to each individual to choose which tool they prefer to use.

Sometimes white or straight teeth are associated with oral hygiene. However, a hygienic mouth can have stained teeth or crooked teeth. To improve the appearance of their teeth, people may use tooth whitening treatments and orthodontics.

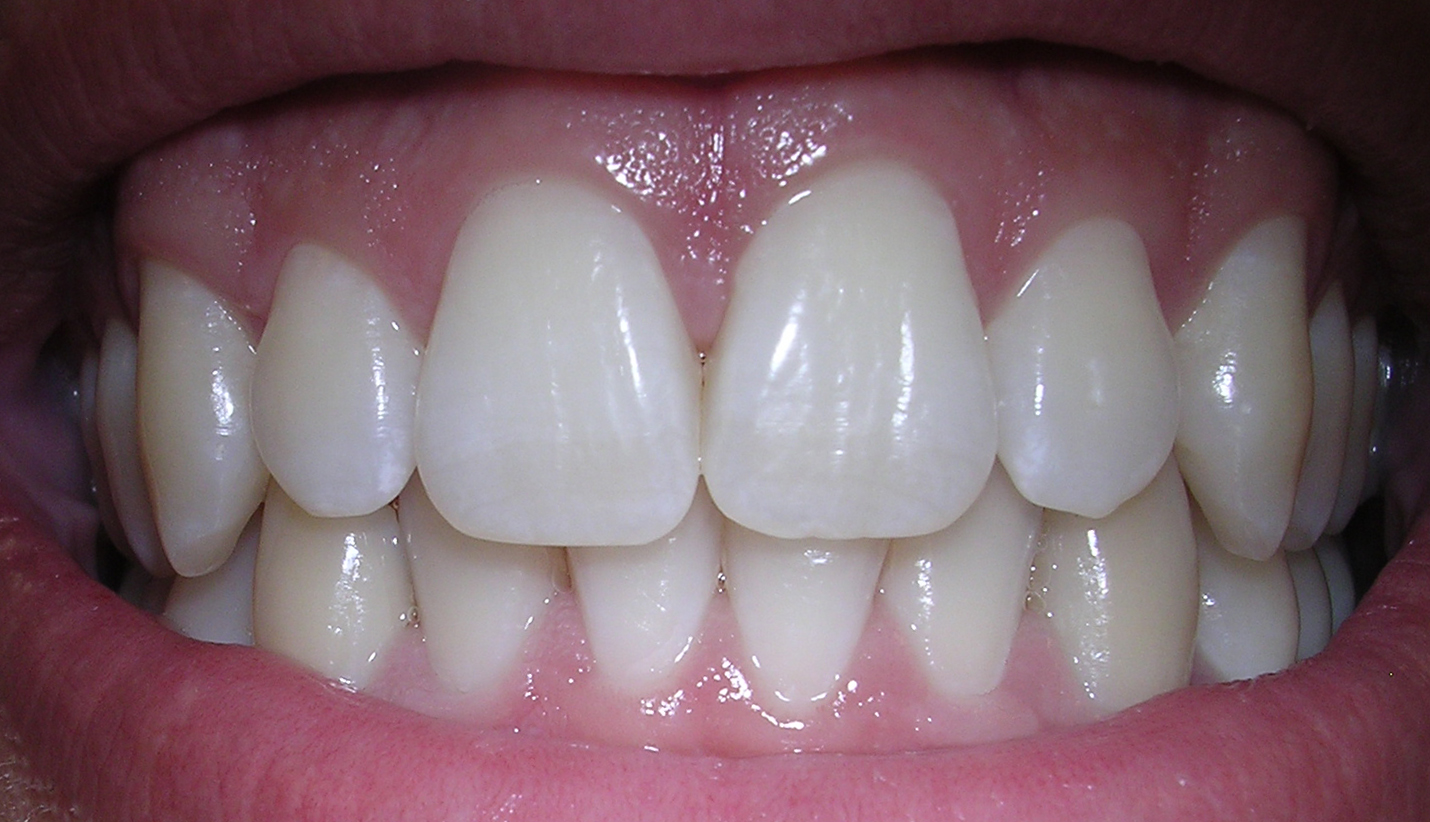
A healthy smile

The importance of the role of the oral microbiome in dental health has been increasingly recognized. Data from human oral microbiology research shows that a commensal microflora can switch to an opportunistic pathogenic flora through complex changes in their environment. These changes are driven by the host rather than the bacteria. Archeological evidence of calcified dental plaque shows marked shifts in the oral microbiome towards a disease-associated microbiome with cariogenic bacteria becoming dominant during the Industrial Revolution. Streptococcus mutans is the most important bacteria in causing caries. Modern oral microbiota are significantly less diverse than historic populations. Caries (cavities), for example, have become a major endemic disease, affecting 60–90% of schoolchildren in industrialized countries. In contrast, dental caries and periodontal diseases were rare in the pre-Neolithic era and in early hominins.

== Tooth cleaning and decay ==
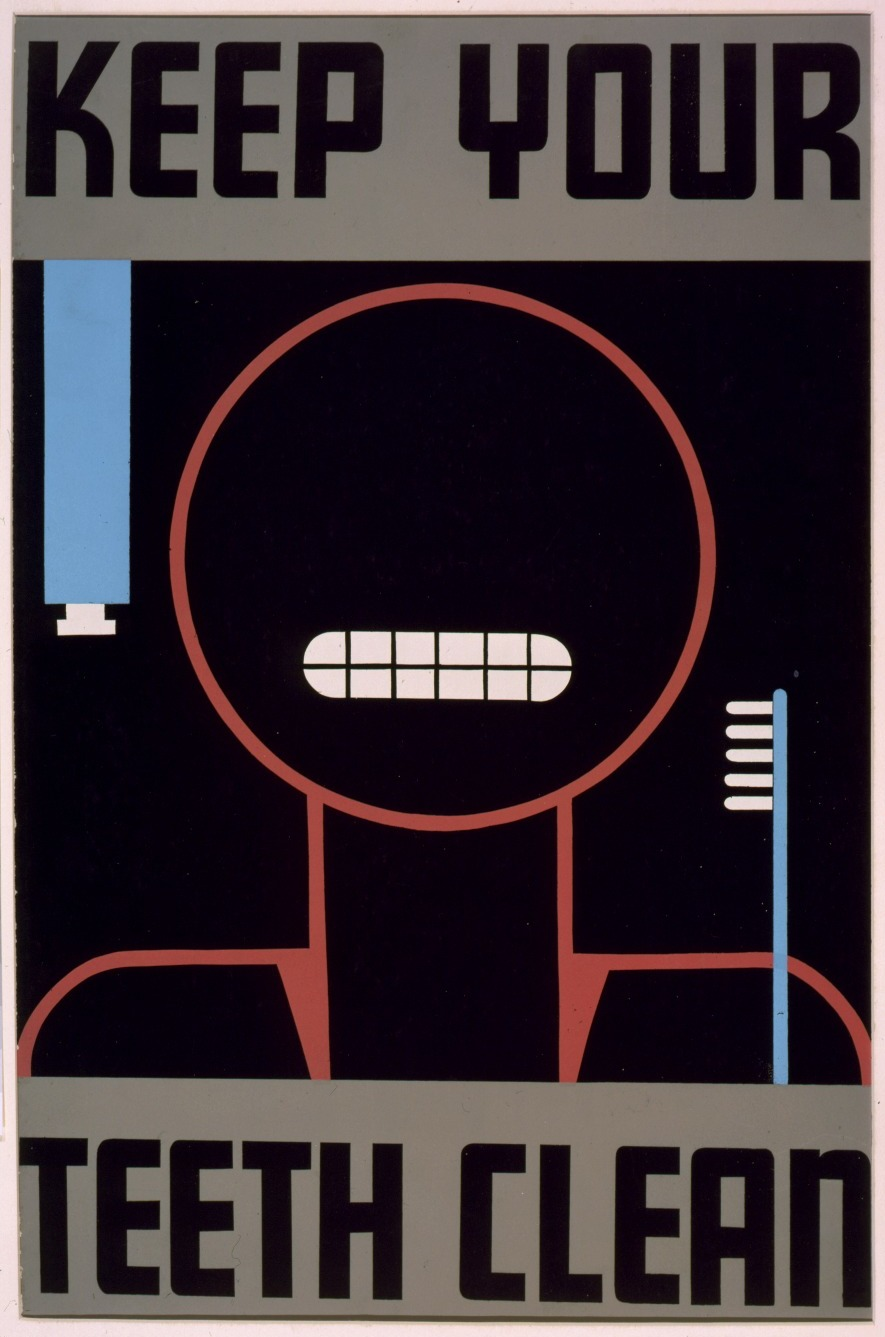
A 1930s poster from the Work Projects Administration promoting oral hygiene

Tooth decay is the most common global disease. Over 80% of cavities occur inside fissures in teeth where brushing cannot reach food left trapped after eating and saliva and fluoride have no access to neutralize acid and remineralize demineralized teeth, unlike easy-to-clean parts of the tooth, where fewer cavities occur.

Teeth cleaning is the removal of dental plaque and tartar from teeth to prevent cavities, gingivitis, gum disease, and tooth decay. Severe gum disease causes at least one-third of adult tooth loss.

Since before recorded history, a variety of oral hygiene measures have been used for teeth cleaning. This has been verified by various excavations done throughout the world, in which chew sticks, tree twigs, bird feathers, animal bones and porcupine quills have been found. In historic times, different forms of tooth cleaning tools have been used. Indian medicine (Ayurveda) has used the neem tree, or daatun, and its products to create teeth cleaning twigs and similar products; a person chews one end of the neem twig until it somewhat resembles the bristles of a toothbrush, and then uses it to brush the teeth. In the Muslim world, the miswak, or siwak, made from a twig or root, has antiseptic properties and has been widely used since the Islamic Golden Age. Rubbing baking soda or chalk against the teeth was also common; however, this can increase gum and tooth sensitivity.

The Australian Healthcare and Hospital Association's (AHHA) most recent evidence brief suggests that dental check-ups should be conducted once every three years for adults, and one every two years for children. It has been documented that dental professionals frequently advise for more frequent visits, but this advice is contraindicated by evidence suggesting that check up frequency should be based on individual risk factors, or the AHHA's check-up schedule. In the UK, it is common practice to invite people for check-ups every 6 months; however, recent research has shown that this isn't necessary for people who have low risk of oral disease. Professional cleaning includes tooth scaling, tooth polishing, and, if tartar has accumulated, debridement; this is usually followed by a fluoride treatment. However, the American Dental Hygienists' Association (ADHA) stated in 1998 that there is no evidence that scaling and polishing only above the gums provides therapeutic value, and cleaning should be done under the gums as well. The Cochrane Oral Health Group found only three studies meeting the criteria for inclusion in their study and found little evidence in them to support claims of benefits from supragingival (above the gum) tooth scaling or tooth polishing.

Dentists can apply Dental sealants which cover and protect fissures and grooves in the chewing surfaces of back teeth. This prevents food from becoming trapped and thereby halts the decay process. An elastomer strip has been shown to force sealant deeper inside opposing chewing surfaces and can also force fluoride toothpaste inside chewing surfaces to aid in remineralising demineralised teeth.

Between cleanings by a dental hygienist, good oral hygiene is essential for preventing tartar build-up which causes the problems mentioned above. This is done through careful, frequent brushing with a toothbrush, combined with the use of dental floss or interdental brushes to prevent accumulation of plaque on the teeth. Powered toothbrushes reduce dental plaque and gingivitis more than manual toothbrushing in both short and long term. Further evidence is needed to determine the clinical importance of these findings.

Patients need to be aware of the importance of brushing and flossing their teeth daily. New parents need to be educated to promote healthy habits in their children.

== Sources of problems ==
=== Plaque ===
Dental plaque, also known as dental biofilm, is a sticky, yellow film consisting of a wide range of bacteria that attaches to the tooth surfaces and can be visible around the gum line. It starts to reappear after the tooth surface has been cleaned, which is why regular brushing is encouraged. A high-sugar diet encourages the formation of plaque. Sugar (fermentable carbohydrates), is converted into acid by the plaque. The acid then causes the breakdown of the adjacent tooth, eventually leading to tooth decay.

If plaque is left on a subgingival (under the gum) surface undisturbed, not only is there an increased risk of tooth decay, but it will also go on to irritate the gums and make them appear red and swollen. Some bleeding may be noticed during tooth brushing or flossing. These are the signs of inflammation that indicate poor gum health (gingivitis).

==== Calculus ====
Dental calculus is composed of calcium phosphate minerals with live microorganisms that is covered by an unmineralized layer. The longer that plaque stays on the tooth surface, the harder and more attached to the tooth it becomes. That is when it is referred to as calculus and needs to be removed by a dental professional. If this is not treated, the inflammation will lead to the bone loss and will eventually lead to the affected teeth becoming loose.

== Preventive care ==
=== Tooth brushing ===
Routine tooth brushing is the principal method of preventing many oral diseases, and perhaps the most important activity an individual can practice to reduce plaque buildup. Controlling plaque reduces the risk of the individual with plaque-associated diseases such as gingivitis, periodontitis, and caries – the three most common oral diseases. The average brushing time for individuals is between 30 seconds and just over 60 seconds. Many oral health care professionals agree that tooth brushing should be done for a minimum of two minutes, and be practiced at least twice a day. Brushing for at least two minutes per session is optimal for preventing the most common oral diseases, and removes considerably more plaque than brushing for only 45 seconds.

Toothbrushing can only clean to a depth of about 1.5 mm inside the gingival pockets, but a sustained regime of plaque removal above the gum line can affect the ecology of the microbes below the gums and may reduce the number of pathogens in pockets up to 5 mm in depth.

Toothpaste (dentifrice) with fluoride, or alternatives such as nano-hydroxyapatite, is an important tool to readily use when tooth brushing. The fluoride (or alternative) in the dentifrice is an important protective factor against caries, and an important supplement needed to remineralize already affected enamel. Currently, there is insufficient evidence to evaluate the caries inhibiting characteristics of slow release fluoride glass beads. However, in terms of preventing gum disease, the use of toothpaste does not increase the effectiveness of the activity with respect to the amount of plaque removed.

Population studies shown that regular tooth brushing is associated with reduced risk of cardiovascular diseases and better blood pressure profile. Moreover, professional dental cleaning reduces serum levels of early inflammatory markers such as TNF-α, IL-6 and CRP.

==== Manual toothbrush ====
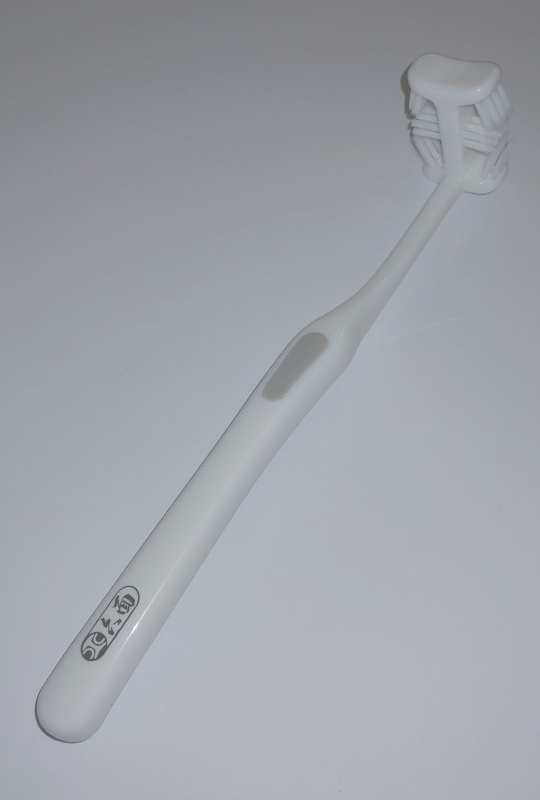
A six-sided toothbrush used to brush all sides of the teeth, in both the upper and lower jaw, at the same time

The modern manual tooth brush is a dental tool which consists of a head of nylon bristles attached to a long handle to help facilitate the manual action of tooth brushing. Furthermore, the handle aids in reaching as far back as teeth erupt in the oral cavity. The tooth brush is arguably a person's best tool for removing dental plaque from teeth, thus capable of preventing all plaque-related diseases if used routinely, correctly and effectively. Oral health professionals recommend the use of a tooth brush with a small head and soft bristles as they are most effective in removing plaque without damaging the gums.

The technique is crucial to the effectiveness of tooth brushing and disease prevention. Back and forth brushing is not effective in removing plaque at the gum line. Tooth brushing should employ a systematic approach, angle the bristles at a 45-degree angle towards the gums, and make small circular motions at that angle. This action increases the effectiveness of the technique in removing plaque at the gum line.

==== Electric toothbrush ====
Electric toothbrushes are toothbrushes with moving or vibrating bristle heads. The two main types of electric toothbrushes are the sonic type which has a vibrating head, and the oscillating-rotating type in which the bristle head makes constant clockwise and anti-clockwise movements. Electric toothbrushes are more expensive than manual toothbrushes and more damaging to the environment.

Sonic or ultrasonic toothbrushes vibrate at a high frequency with a small amplitude, and a fluid turbulent activity that aids in plaque removal. The rotating type might reduce plaque and gingivitis compared to manual brushing, though it is currently uncertain whether this is of clinical significance. The movements of the bristles and their vibrations help break up chains of bacteria up to 5mm below the gum line. The oscillating-rotating electric toothbrush on the other hand uses the same mechanical action as produced by manual tooth brushing – removing plaque via mechanical disturbance of the biofilm – however at a higher frequency.

Using electric tooth brushes is less complex in regards to brushing technique, making it a viable option for children, and adults with limited dexterity. The bristle head should be guided from tooth to tooth slowly, following the contour of the gums and crowns of the tooth. The motion of the toothbrush head removes the need to manually oscillate the brush or make circles.

=== Flossing ===
Tooth brushing alone will not remove plaque from all surfaces of the tooth as 40% of the surfaces are interdental. One technique that can be used to access these areas is dental floss. When the proper technique is used, flossing can remove plaque and food particles from between the teeth and below the gums. The American Dental Association (ADA) reports that up to 80% of plaque may be removed by this method. The ADA recommends cleaning between the teeth as part of one's daily oral hygiene regime.

Types of floss include:

- Unwaxed floss: Unbound nylon filaments that spread across the tooth. Plaque and debris get trapped for easy removal.
- Waxed floss: less susceptible to tearing or shredding when used between tight contacts or areas with overhanging restorations.
- Polytetrafluoroethylene (Teflon): Slides easily through tight contacts and does not fray.

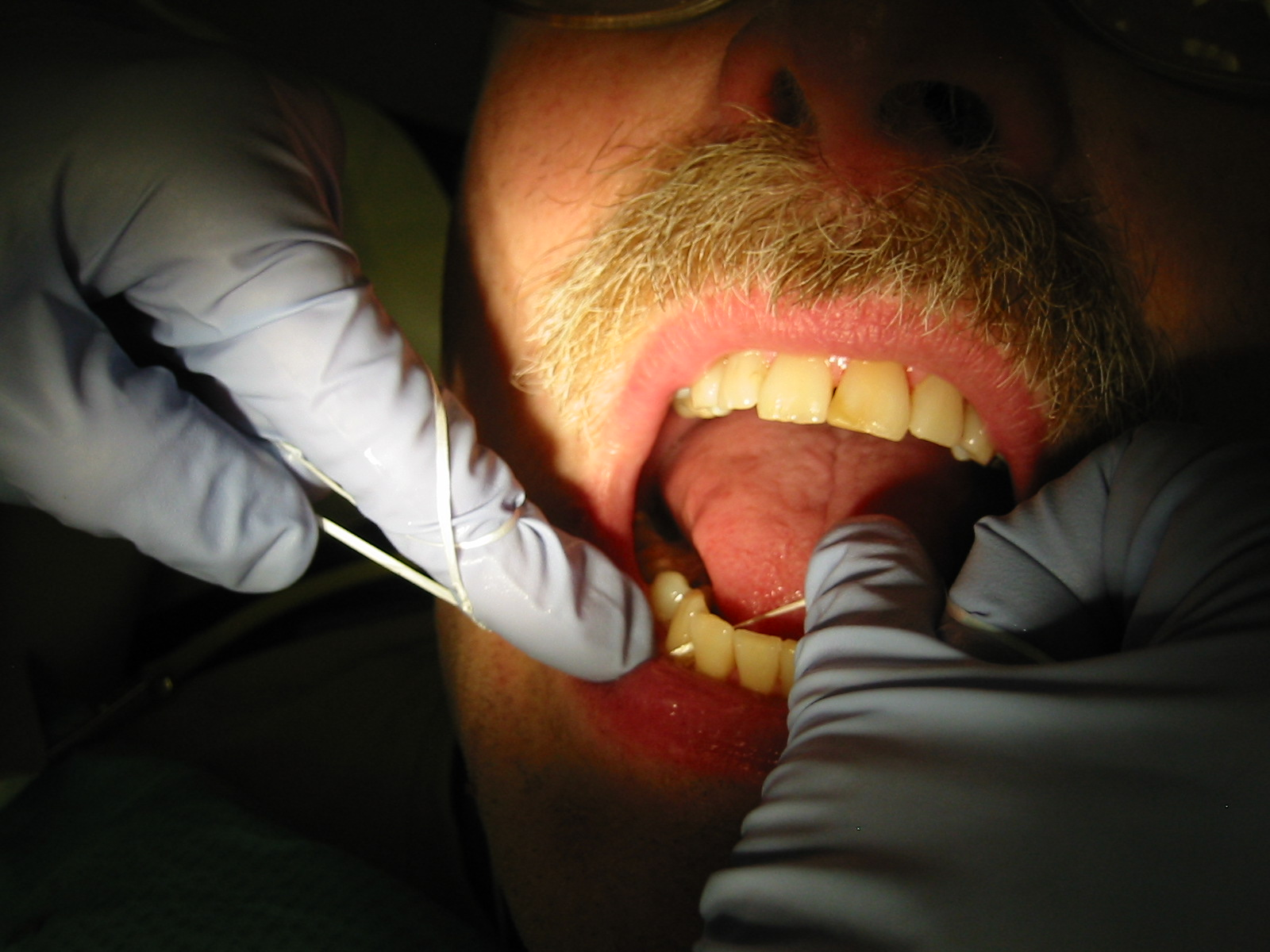
A dental hygienist demonstrates dental flossing.

The type of floss used is a personal preference; however, without proper technique it may not be effective. The correct technique to ensure maximum plaque removal is as follows:

1. Floss length: 15–25 cm wrapped around middle fingers.
2. For upper teeth grasp the floss with thumb and index finger, for lower teeth with both index fingers. Ensure that a length of roughly an inch is left between the fingers.
3. Ease the floss gently between the teeth using a back and forth motion.
4. Position the floss in such a way that it becomes securely wrapped around the interdental surface of the tooth in a C shape.
5. Ensure that the floss is taken below the gum margins using a back and forth up and down motion.

There are a few different options on the market that can make flossing easier if dexterity or coordination is a barrier, or as a preference over normal floss. Floss threaders are ideal for cleaning between orthodontic appliances, and flossettes are ideal for children and those with poor dexterity. Special flossettes are made for those with orthodontics.

=== Interdental brushes ===
Interdental brushes come in a range of color-coded sizes. They consist of a handle with a piece of wire covered in tapered bristles, designed to be placed into the interdental space for plaque removal. Studies indicate that interdental brushes are equally or more effective than floss when removing plaque and reducing gum inflammation. They are especially recommended to people with orthodontics, often to use as well as floss.

The steps in using an interdental brush are as follows:

1. Identify the size required, the largest size that will fit without force is ideal, if necessary more than one size can be used.
2. Insert the bristles into the interdental space at a 90-degree angle.
3. Move the brush back and forth between the teeth.
4. Rinse under water to remove debris when necessary.
5. Rinse with warm soapy water once complete and store in a clean dry area.
6. Replace once bristles are worn.

=== Tongue scrapers ===
The tongue contains numerous bacteria which causes bad breath. Bad breath, also considered as Halitosis, is a bad oral hygiene habit that also leads to dehydration and other medical conditions. Tongue cleaners are designed to remove the debris built up on the tongue. Using a toothbrush to clean the tongue is another possibility, however it might be hard to reach the back of the tongue and the bristles of the toothbrush may be too soft to remove the debris. Steps of using a tongue scraper:

1. Rinse the tongue scraper in order to clean it and remove any present debris
2. Start at the back of the tongue and gently scrape forwards. Be sure to clean the sides of the tongue, as well as the middle portion
3. After the cleaning is completed, rinse the tongue scraper and any debris that is left behind
4. Rinse the mouth

=== Oral irrigation ===
Some dental professionals recommend subgingival irrigation, also known as water flossing, as a way to clean teeth and gums. Oral irrigators may be used instead of or in addition to flossing.

=== Single-tufted brushes ===
Single-tufted brushes are a tool in conjunction with tooth brushing. The tooth brush is designed to reach the 'hard to reach places' within the mouth. This tool is best used behind the lower front teeth, behind the back molars, crooked teeth and between spaces where teeth have been removed. The single- tufted brush design has an angled handle, a 4mm diameter and rounded bristle tips.

=== Gum stimulators ===
Toothbrushes with pointed rubber tips at the ends of the handles have been available for many years, and have more recently been replaced by a standalone tool called a gum stimulator designed to massage the gum line and the bases of the areas between the teeth. Such stimulators help to increase circulation to the gum line and to clear away bacteria which might not be removed by brushing and flossing alone.

=== Oral swabs ===
Oral care swabs, commonly known as Toothettes, are small sponges attached to a stick, often used for oral care in hospital or long-term care settings. The sponge is used to moisten and clear the patient's mouth of debris or thickened saliva in situations where conventional toothbrushing is not an option.

=== Dental probiotics ===
Some people use probiotics for gingivitis, halitosis, and more.

== Food and drink ==
Foods that help muscles and bones also help teeth and gums. Vitamin C is necessary, for example, to prevent scurvy, which manifests as serious gum disease.

Eating a balanced diet and limiting sugar intake can help prevent tooth decay and periodontal disease. The Fédération dentaire internationale (FDI World Dental Federation) has promoted foods such as raw vegetables, plain yogurt, cheese, or fruit as dentally beneficial—this has been echoed by the American Dental Association (ADA).

=== Chewing gum ===
Chewing gum assists oral irrigation between and around the teeth, cleaning and removing particles, but for teeth in poor condition it may damage or remove loose fillings as well. Dental chewing gums claim to improve dental health. Sugar-free chewing gum stimulates saliva production, and helps to clean the surface of the teeth.

=== Ice ===
Chewing on solid objects such as ice can chip teeth, leading to further tooth fractures. Chewing on ice has been linked to symptoms of anemia. People with anemia tend to want to eat food with no nutritional value.

== Other ==
Smoking is one of the leading risk factors associated with periodontal diseases. It is thought that smoking impairs and alters normal immune responses, eliciting destructive processes while inhibiting reparative responses promoting the incidence and development of periodontal diseases.

People with intellectual disabilities have increased risk of developing oral health problems like gum diseases or dental decay, although clinical research has provided little evidence that typical oral hygiene practices are effective in this population.

== Mouthwash ==
There are three commonly used kinds of mouthwash: saline (salty water), essential oils (Listerine, etc.), and chlorhexidine gluconate.

=== Saline ===
Saline (warm salty water) is usually recommended after procedures like dental extractions. In a study completed in 2014, warm saline mouthrinse was compared to no mouthrinse in preventing alveolar osteitis (dry socket) after extraction. In the group that was instructed to rinse with saline, the prevalence of alveolar osteitis was less than in the group that did not.

=== Essential oils (EO) or cetyl pyridinium chloride (CPC) ===
Essential oils, found in Listerine mouthwash, contains eucalyptol, menthol, thymol, and methyl salicylate. CPC containing mouthwash contains cetyl pyridinium chloride, found in brands such as Colgate Plax, Crest Pro Health, Oral B Pro Health Rinse. In a meta-analyses completed in 2016, EO and CPC mouthrinses were compared and it was found that plaque and gingivitis levels were lower with EO mouthrinse when used as an adjunct to mechanical plaque removal (toothbrushing and interdental cleaning).

=== Chlorhexidine ===
Chlorhexidine gluconate is an antiseptic mouthrinse that should only be used in two-week time periods due to brown staining on the teeth and tongue. Compared to essential oils, it is more efficacious in controlling plaque levels, but has no better effect on gingivitis and is therefore generally used for post-surgical wound healing or the short-term control of plaque.

=== Sodium hypochlorite ===
As mentioned earlier, sodium hypochlorite, a common household bleach, can be used as a 0.2% solution for 30 seconds two or three times a week as a cheap and effective means of combating harmful bacteria. The commercial product is 5% or 6%, so this requires diluting the product by a factor of about 30 (half a tablespoon in a full glass of water). The solution will lose activity with time and may be discarded after one day.

== Appliances care ==
=== Dentures ===
Dentures must be kept extremely clean. It is recommended that dentures be cleaned mechanically twice a day with a soft-bristled brush and denture cleansing paste. It is not recommended to use toothpaste, as it is too abrasive for acrylic, and will leave plaque retentive scratches in the surface. Dentures should be taken out at night, as leaving them in whilst sleeping has been linked to poor oral health. Leaving a denture in during sleep reduces the protective cleansing and antibacterial properties of saliva against Candida albicans (oral thrush) and denture stomatitis; the inflammation and redness of the oral mucosa underneath the denture. For the elderly, wearing a denture during sleep has been proven to greatly increase the risk of pneumonia. It is now recommended that dentures should be stored in a dry container overnight, as keeping dentures dry for 8 hours significantly reduces the amount of Candida albicans on an acrylic denture. Approximately once a week it is recommended to soak a denture overnight with an alkaline-peroxide denture cleansing tablet, as this has been proved to reduce bacterial mass and pathogenicity.

=== Retainers ===
As with dentures, it is recommended to clean retainers properly at least once a day (avoiding toothpaste and using soap) and to soak them overnight with an alkaline-peroxide denture cleansing tablet once a week. Hot temperatures will warp the shape of the retainer, therefore rinsing under cold water is preferred. Keeping the retainer in a plastic case and rinsing it beforehand considered to help reduce the number of bacteria being transferred back into the mouth.

=== Braces ===
While undertaking the braces treatment, it is recommended to use a small-sized or specialized toothbrush with a soft head to access hard-to-reach areas. Brushing after every meal is highly advisable. Using a high fluoride toothpaste during treatment can be more effective than using a normal toothpaste. Regular flossing is as important as brushing, and helps to remove any plaque build-up, as well as smaller food particles that are stuck in your braces or between your teeth. Floss threaders for braces or interdental brushes are also an option. Furthermore, fluoride foam (high fluoride concentrations) application by a dentist every 6–8 weeks during treatment, could reduce dental decay. However, more research needs to be carried out regarding this.

== Education ==
To become a dental hygienist in the U.S. one must attend a college or university that is approved by the Commission on Dental Accreditation and take the National Board Dental Hygiene Examination. There are several degrees one may receive. An associate degree after attending community college is the most common and only takes two years to obtain. After doing so, one may work in a dental office. There is also the option of receiving a bachelor's degree or master's degree if one plans to work in an educational institute either for teaching or research.

== Oral hygiene and systemic diseases ==
Several recent clinical studies suggest oral disease and inflammation (oral bacteria & oral infections) may be a risk factor for serious systemic diseases, such as:

- cardiovascular disease (heart attack and Stroke)
- bacterial pneumonia: Oral hygiene care for critically ill patients has been reported to reduce the risk of ventilator-associated pneumonia.
- low birth weight or extreme high birth weight of one's baby
- diabetes complications
- osteoporosis

== Relation to mental health ==
There is found to be a strong correlation between people with mental health disorders and having dental fear. People suffering from mental health disorders can have problems arising due to neglect of daily care of oral hygiene. For example, the problems that may arise are dry mouth, dental caries, jaw pain, oral cancer, and periodontitis (also called gum disease). In a twenty-five-year study, it was found that people suffering from mental health disorders have a 2.8 times increased chance of losing their teeth.

In a study of an Australian community, there was a semi-structured interview that included males and females over the age of eighteen. The goal was to see how having mental health challenges affects a person's overall health, focusing mainly on oral health. The results showed not going to the dentist for cleanings, and not brushing their teeth at all, resulted in signs of tooth decay.

The findings showed that individuals were less likely to go to the dentist regularly because they felt that they would be treated differently, unfairly, or judged . At a National Opinion Research Center at the University of Chicago, a survey of about 150 questions was asked to a group of about 17,000 people. It was found that people struggling with bad oral health came from areas of low income, did not visit the dentist regularly, and struggled with poor mental health.

In a study involving 2,784 psychiatric patients and 31,084 people from the general population, along with 131 nurses, a dental hygienist educated these patients on the importance of oral hygiene. The dental hygienist provided a twenty-minute PowerPoint presentation to show proper cleaning methods. The psychiatric patients observed that their oral hygiene was lacking and after the presentation, their oral care increased drastically. It was reported by Shappell and her colleagues that individuals with psychiatric disorders stated that they do nothing for their oral health. She found that these individuals struggle with chronic oral pain and that is a stressor that decreases serotonin levels causing their mental health disorders to be a bigger challenge.

=== Relation to cognitive decline ===
Poor oral health has not been identified as a known risk factor for dementia but there is evidence for its association with cognitive decline. Different factors have been proposed including inflammatory gum diseases, and tooth loss that impairs proper chewing of food, impacting diet and quality of life. Oral health declines with advancing cognitive impairment, due in part to an increased inability to maintain daily self-care, and also barriers to dental care access. Increasing evidence indicates that poor oral health may be more than just a result of dementia and could be a causative factor.

== See also ==
- Dental floss
- Mouth breathing
- Maternal oral health
- Obligate nasal breathing
- Periodontology
- Tooth brushing
- List of oral health and dental topics
- List of basic dentistry topics
