= Adenoid hypertrophy =

Enlargement of the adenoid tonsil

- Other names: Enlarged adenoids
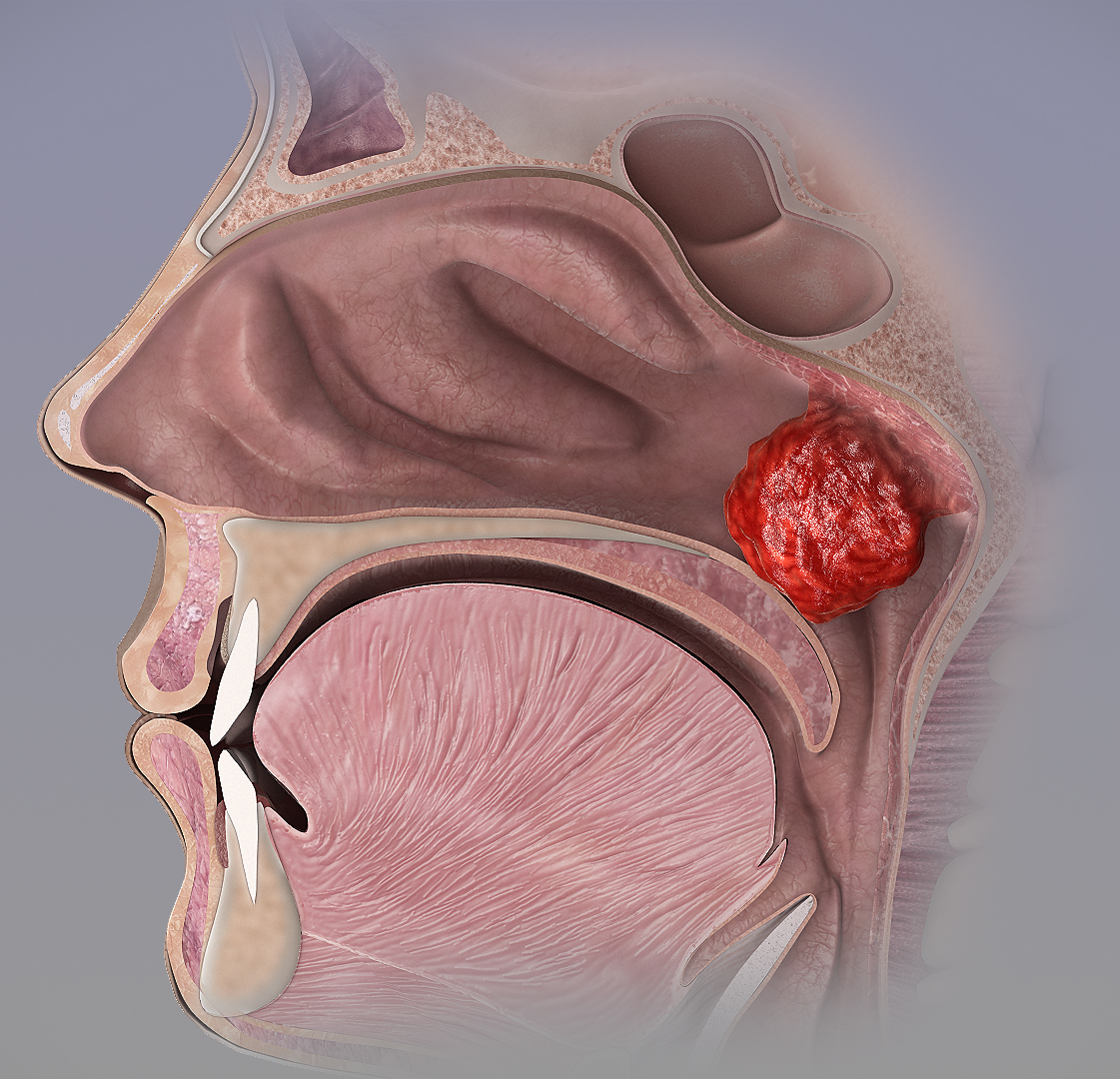
- 3D still showing adenoid hypertrophy.
- Specialty: Otorhinolaryngology

Adenoid hypertrophy, also known as enlarged adenoids refers to an enlargement of the adenoid (pharyngeal tonsil) that is linked to nasopharyngeal mechanical blockage and/or chronic inflammation. Adenoid hypertrophy is a characterized by hearing loss, recurrent otitis media, mucopurulent rhinorrhea, chronic mouth breathing, nasal airway obstruction, increased infection susceptibility, dental malposition, and dentofacial abnormalities ("adenoid facies" or "mouth breather face").

The exact cause of adenoid hypertrophy in children remains unclear, but it is likely linked to immunological responses, hormonal factors, or genetic components. Adenoid hypertrophy is an immunological abnormality characterized by altered cytokine production, with children experiencing higher levels of proinflammatory cytokines. Adenoid hypertrophy can also be caused by gastric juice exposure during gastroesophageal reflux disease, passive smoking, and recurrent bacterial and viral infections. Pathogen colonization can disrupt the immune system's equilibrium with the adenoid's natural flora. Genetic factors, such as variations in TLR2 and TLR4 genes, also contribute to the condition. Adenoids naturally undergo hypertrophy between the ages of 6-10 and atrophy around 16 years old.

A clinical examination and nasoendoscopy are the gold standard for diagnosing adenoid hypertrophy. Visual examinations should be conducted to identify adenoid facies, eczema, and similar signs in diseases like partial choanal atresia, significant palatine tonsil hyperplasia, nasal airway blockage, endonasal foreign bodies, nasal concha hyperplasia, and allergic or viral rhinitis. Neoplasms, benign or malignant ones, should be ruled out. Screening for juvenile nasopharyngeal angiofibroma is crucial in male adolescents, while adult patients should be evaluated for carcinoma and lymphoma. Thornwaldt cysts should also be considered in the differential diagnosis.

Patients with adenoid hyperplasia alone should follow conservative therapy and off-label intranasal corticosteroids. Patients with significant symptoms and unsatisfactory responses to conservative measures may be candidates for adenoidectomy. An adenoidectomy can shrink and reduce nasal obstruction in patients. Patients usually experience improved eustachian tube function, reduced obstruction, and decreased nasal discharge. The prevalence of adenoid hypertrophy in the pediatric population is estimated to be 34%.

== Signs and symptoms ==
Enlarged adenoids can become nearly the size of a ping pong ball and completely block airflow through the nasal passages. Even if enlarged adenoids are not substantial enough to physically block the back of the nose, they can obstruct airflow enough so that nasal breathing requires an uncomfortable amount of work, and inhalation occurs instead through mouth breathing. Adenoids can also obstruct the nasal airway enough to affect the voice without stopping nasal airflow.

Adenoid hypertrophy is characterized by several typical signs and symptoms, including conductive hearing loss, recurrent otitis media (including cholesteatoma), mucopurulent rhinorrhea, chronic mouth breathing, nasal airway obstruction, increased susceptibility to infection, and occasionally dental malposition.

=== Complications ===
If left untreated, adenoid hypertrophy can cause pulmonary hypertension, ear issues, obstructive sleep apnea, failure to thrive, and craniofacial abnormalities.

== Causes ==
The exact cause of adenoid hypertrophy in children is unclear. Most likely, immunological responses, hormonal factors, or genetic components have some relationship. Contributing environmental factors include air pollution and smoking.

One of the immunological abnormalities described is altered cytokine production. For instance, it was demonstrated that interleukin (IL)-32 was upregulated in adenoid tissue. This could potentially impact the progression of adenoid hypertrophy by inducing the production of proinflammatory cytokines and inducing pyroptosis in human nasal epithelial cells, which is mediated by the NOD1/2/TLR4/NLRP3 pathway.

Furthermore, it has been discovered that children with adenoid hypertrophy had higher levels of proinflammatory cytokines, including interferon-γ (IFN-γ), high-sensitivity C-reactive protein, IL-1 and IL-10, TNF-α (tumor necrosis factor α), and intercellular adhesion molecule-1.

=== Risk factors ===
Adenoid hypertrophy may also be brought on by gastric juice exposure during gastroesophageal reflux disease, particularly in infants and early toddlers. An additional risk factor for adenoid hypertrophy is passive smoking.

=== Triggers ===
Recurrent bacterial and viral infections as well as pathogen colonization might upset the normally stable equilibrium between the immune system and the natural flora of the adenoid. Hypertrophic processes are frequently brought on by recurrent upper respiratory tract infections or allergies. The bacteria Haemophilus influenza, Streptococcus pneumoniae, Streptococcus pyogenes, and Staphylococcus aureus are most frequently isolated from adenoid tissue. Pathogens that are anaerobic bacteria are also found in chronic infections.

=== Genetics ===
Genetic factors include, for example, variations in the genes encoding TLR2 and TLR4, SCGB1D4, and other genes.

== Mechanism ==
The clinical and anatomic basis of hypertrophy is the enlargement of the germinal centers of lymphoid tissue and lymphoid follicles. The fundamental reason is thought to be a vicious cycle of inflammation, hypertrophy and/or hyperplasia, secretory retention, and recurrent inflammation.

Adenoid is a lymphoid tissue condensation at the back of the nose or on the nasopharyngeal posterosuperior wall. The adenoid is part of Waldeyer's Ring. In younger children, it seems to play a significant part in the establishment of a "immunological memory." Adenoids naturally undergo hypertrophy between the ages of 6 and 10 and atrophy around the age 16.

The tonsils in the back of the mouth, the adenoid, and the tonsilar tissue at the base of the tongue combine to form Waldeyer's ring, a tissue ring that helps keep toxins, bacteria, and viruses out of the body. B lymphocytes, a kind of blood cell that produces antibodies, make up the majority of the tissues found in the tonsils and adenoid glands. This antibody binds to toxins, germs, and viruses, rendering them inactive, preventing disease-causing agents from entering the body. The adenoid is situated toward the rear of the nasal cavity and up behind the soft palate, in contrast to the tonsils, which are visible when one looks straight through the mouth. Similar to tonsilar tissue, the adenoid can be affected by both acute and long-term infections. A persistent infection or inflammation may cause the adenoid to enlarge gradually. Due to its location at the rear of the nasal cavity, its primary symptoms have an impact on nasal function.

During the early years of life, the adenoids expand quickly due to their immunological roles. Its size and form change dramatically during childhood, with dynamic growth occurring between the ages of 3 and 6 years. This may be due to the nasopharyngeal cavity growing more slowly than expected. Under normal circumstances, the adenoid grows less after the age of six, and the nasopharyngeal cavity expands and widens the respiratory tract. Due to the proliferation of fibrous tissue and fatty atrophy, the lymphoid tissue experiences involution later in life. As a result, in the majority of people, adenoid tissue exists in a residual form but never totally vanishes.

Macroscopic changes accompany the microscopic and functional changes within. In humans, these adenoids are most immunologically active between the ages of 4 and 10, and after puberty, they start to involute. The population of B cells declines and the ratio of T cells to B cells rises as a result. Inflammation of the crypts due to adenoid infection causes immunologically active cells to become inactive, reducing their capacity to transfer antigens. This, in turn, causes the cells to metaplasia into a multilayered squamous epithelium. Such alterations result in poor cell functioning and ineffective antigen uptake.

== Diagnosis ==
Currently, a thorough clinical examination combined with nasoendoscopy (NE), notably nasopharyngoscopy, is the gold standard for diagnosing adenoid hypertrophy.

Visual examination should be conducted primarily to determine whether adenoid facies are present. The mouth is usually open, and the tip of the tongue is visible in a patient with an adenoid facies. Furthermore, eczema is frequently seen at the nasal opening.

Similar signs and symptoms can be found in diseases, such as partial choanal atresia and significant palatine tonsil hyperplasia. Nasal airway blockage can also result from endonasal foreign bodies, nasal concha hyperplasia, and allergic or viral rhinitis. Neoplasms that are benign or malignant in particular need to be ruled out. It is important to screen for juvenile nasopharyngeal angiofibroma in male adolescents in particular. Adult patients, on the other hand, need to be evaluated particularly for carcinoma and lymphoma, which typically present with symptoms including ulceration, bleeding, slimy coatings, size increases, and conductive hearing loss. A spherical tumor of the nasopharynx coated in smooth mucosa called a Thornwaldt cyst should also be considered in the differential diagnosis.

== Treatment ==
In patients with adenoid hyperplasia alone without accompanying indications or symptoms, conservative therapy, i.e., cautious waiting, is advised. Furthermore, data is indicating that people with adenoid hyperplasia may benefit from off-label intranasal corticosteroids.

Patients exhibiting significant symptoms (such as repeated fever and infections, persistent ear problems) and/or unsatisfactory response to conservative measures (such as topical cortisone, anti-allergic therapy, and watchful waiting) are candidates for adenoidectomy. Individuals with long-term serous or mucous otitis media frequently have an adenoidectomy, myringotomy, and/or tube insertions performed.

== Outlook ==
If the adenoid is acutely swollen and responds well to antibiotic and steroid therapy, it will shrink back to a smaller size and cause less nasal obstruction. After undergoing an adenoidectomy, patients usually experience improvements in their eustachian tube function, a reduction in nasal obstruction, and a decrease in excessive nasal discharge. Of children who undergo adenoidectomy for chronic sinus disease, 25% will experience a resolution of their sinus disease.

== Epidemiology ==
In the pediatric population, the estimated prevalence of adenoid hypertrophy is 34%.

== History ==
The structure that is today known as the adenoid was initially described by the German anatomist Conrad Victor Schneider in 1661. But it wasn't until 1868 that the Danish physician Meyer coined the term "adenoid vegetations." In an original research report, Meyer characterized these adenoid vegetations as "soft tumour masses of the nasopharynx that fill the room above the soft palate." He also realized the connection between adenoid hypertrophy, mouth breathing, snoring, nasal obstruction, and hearing loss. In addition, Meyer suggested using a specific knife that is put into the nasopharynx through the anterior nostrils to treat adenoid hyperplasia surgically.

== See also ==
- Adenoiditis
- Tonsillitis
