= Catarrh =

Inflammation of mucous membranes in one of the airways or cavities of the body

- Other names: Catarrhal inflammation
- Pronunciation: /kəˈtɑːr/ kə-TAR
- Specialty: Pulmonology

Catarrh (/kəˈtɑːr/ kə-TAR) is an inflammation of mucous membranes in one of the airways or cavities of the body, usually with reference to the throat and paranasal sinuses. It can result in a thick exudate of mucus and white blood cells caused by the swelling of the mucous membranes in the head in response to an infection. It is a symptom usually associated with the common cold, pharyngitis, and chesty coughs, but it can also be found in patients with adenoiditis, otitis media, sinusitis or tonsillitis. The phlegm produced by catarrh may either discharge or cause a blockage that may become chronic.

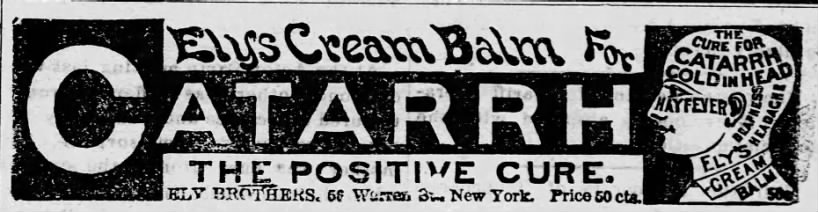
An 1896 ad for Elys Cream Balm, a catarrh remedy

The word "catarrh" was widely used in medicine since before the era of medical science, which explains why it has various senses and in older texts may be synonymous with, or vaguely indistinguishable from, common cold, nasopharyngitis, pharyngitis, rhinitis, or sinusitis. The word is no longer as widely used in American medical practice, mostly because more precise words are available for any particular disease. Indeed, to the extent that it is still used, it is no longer viewed nosologically as a disease entity but instead as a symptom, a sign, or a syndrome of both. The term "catarrh" is found in medical sources from the United Kingdom. The word has also been common in the folk medicine of Appalachia, where medicinal plants have been used to treat the inflammation and drainage associated with the condition.

== Clinical relevance ==
Because of the human ear's function of regulating the pressure within the head region, catarrh blockage may also cause discomfort during changes in atmospheric pressure.

== Etymology ==
The word "catarrh" comes from 15th-century French catarrhe, Latin catarrhus, and Greek Ancient Greek: καταρρεῖν (katarrhein): kata- meaning "down" and rhein meaning "to flow." The Oxford English Dictionary quotes Thomas Bowes' translation of Pierre de la Primaudaye's The [second part of the] French academic (1594): "Sodainely choked by catarrhs, which like to floods of waters, runner downwards."

== See also ==
- Allergy – Immune system response to a substance that most people tolerate well
- Allergic rhinitis, also known as Hay fever – Nasal inflammation due to allergens in the air
- Rhinitis – Irritation and inflammation of the mucous membrane inside the nose
- Rheum – Mucus naturally discharged from eyes, nose, or mouth during sleep
