= Snoring =

Vibratory sound made while asleep

- The soft palate and the base of tongue obstruct the airway in a person sleeping on their back. Snoring is one of the major symptoms of obstructive sleep apnea, although it may occur without any sleep apnea or other medical conditions.
- Specialty: Otorhinolaryngology, sleep medicine

Snoring (or stertor, from Latin stertere 'to snore') is an abnormal breath sound caused by partially obstructed, turbulent airflow and vibration of tissues in the upper respiratory tract (e.g., uvula, soft palate, base of tongue) which occurs during sleep. It usually happens during inhalations (breathing in).

Primary snoring is snoring without any associated sleep disorders and usually without any serious health effects. It is usually defined as apnea–hypopnea index score or respiratory disturbance index score less than 5 events per hour (as diagnosed with polysomnography or home sleep apnea test) and lack of daytime sleepiness.

Snoring may also be a symptom of upper airway resistance syndrome or obstructive sleep apnea (apneic snoring). In obstructive sleep apnea, snoring occurs in combination with breath holding, gasping, or choking.

== Classification ==
In the International Classification of Sleep Disorders third edition (ICSD-3), snoring is listed under "Isolated symptoms and normal variants" in the section "Sleep-related breathing disorders". The manual defines snoring as "a respiratory sound generated in the upper airway during sleep that typically occurs during inspiration but may also occur in expiration."

Primary snoring (also termed simple snoring, non-apneic snoring, or isolated snoring) is snoring without any other associated medical condition. Primary snoring is not associated with episodes of sleep apnea (cessation of breathing), hypopnea, respiratory-effort related arousals, or hypoventilation. Traditionally, primary snoring is considered as benign and having no significant health effects for the individual. However, the idea that primary snoring without sleep apnea has no negative health effects is being increasingly challenged, especially primary snoring in children. For example, there is evidence that primary snoring causes excessive daytime sleepiness, and it may be linked with several other medical problems, some of which are serious. Even so, it is generally accepted that primary snoring cannot be diagnosed in the presence of sleep apnea.

Snoring is one of the main symptoms of obstructive sleep apnea, in which case it is apneic snoring. In obstructive sleep apnea, snoring occurs in combination with other features such as breath holding (breathing cessation), gasping, or choking. There are also other features like daytime sleepiness, non-restorative sleep, fatigue, or insomnia.

Snoring has also been classified according to frequency as occasional snoring (occurring on three nights or less per week) and habitual snoring (occurring on most nights; synonymous with primary snoring).

Snoring has been classified according to apnea–hypopnea index score and severity of associated sleep disorders. Therefore, snoring as a symptom exists as a spectrum of severity, with primary snoring being the least severe, snoring with upper airway resistance syndrome being of intermediate severity, and snoring associated with obstructive sleep apnea being the most medically significant. This spectrum of conditions represents increasing degrees of airway obstruction and severity and frequency of disruption of breathing during sleep.

Obstructive sleep apnea may be subdivided into mild, moderate, and severe types.

- Asymptomatic, non-apneic snoring (primary snoring). No daytime sleepiness and apnea–hypopnea index less than 5 per hour.
- Non-apneic snoring with upper airway resistance syndrome. Daytime sleepiness present. Apnea–hypopnea index less than 5 per hour. Between 5 and 10 respiratory-effort-related arousals per hour. Oxygen saturation more than 90%.
- Apneic snoring (snoring associated with obstructive sleep apnea). Apnea–hypopnea index more than 5 per hour. Oxygen saturation less than 90%. Deviating pattern on electroencephalogram.

Primary snoring is occasionally defined as apnea-hypopnea less than 15 (or less than 10) with body mass index less than 32 kg/m^{2}. It has been suggested that individuals with primary snoring may gradually progress towards obstructive sleep apnea as causative factors such as aging and obesity change over time. However, there is limited evidence for this. 37% of children with primary snoring progressed to obstructive sleep apnea after 4 years. On the other hand, in many cases snoring is resolved over time rather than getting worse.

Snoring severity has also been classified according to average maximum volume:

- Mild (40-50 decibels). Roughly equivalent to quiet conversation.
- Moderate (50–60 dB). Roughly equivalent to a car driving past at low speed.
- Severe (>60 dB). Roughly equivalent to busy traffic or a vacuum cleaner.

In snoring associated with obstructive sleep apnea, louder snoring is correlated with severity of sleep apnea. On average, males snore more loudly than females, and people with higher body mass index snore louder than those with lower body mass index.

=== Distinguishing stertor and stridor ===
Stertor is distinguished from stridor by its pitch. Stertor is low-pitched, and can occur when breathing in, out or both. Stertor and stridor can occur together, such as when adenotonsillar hypertrophy and laryngomalacia occur together.

== Mechanism ==
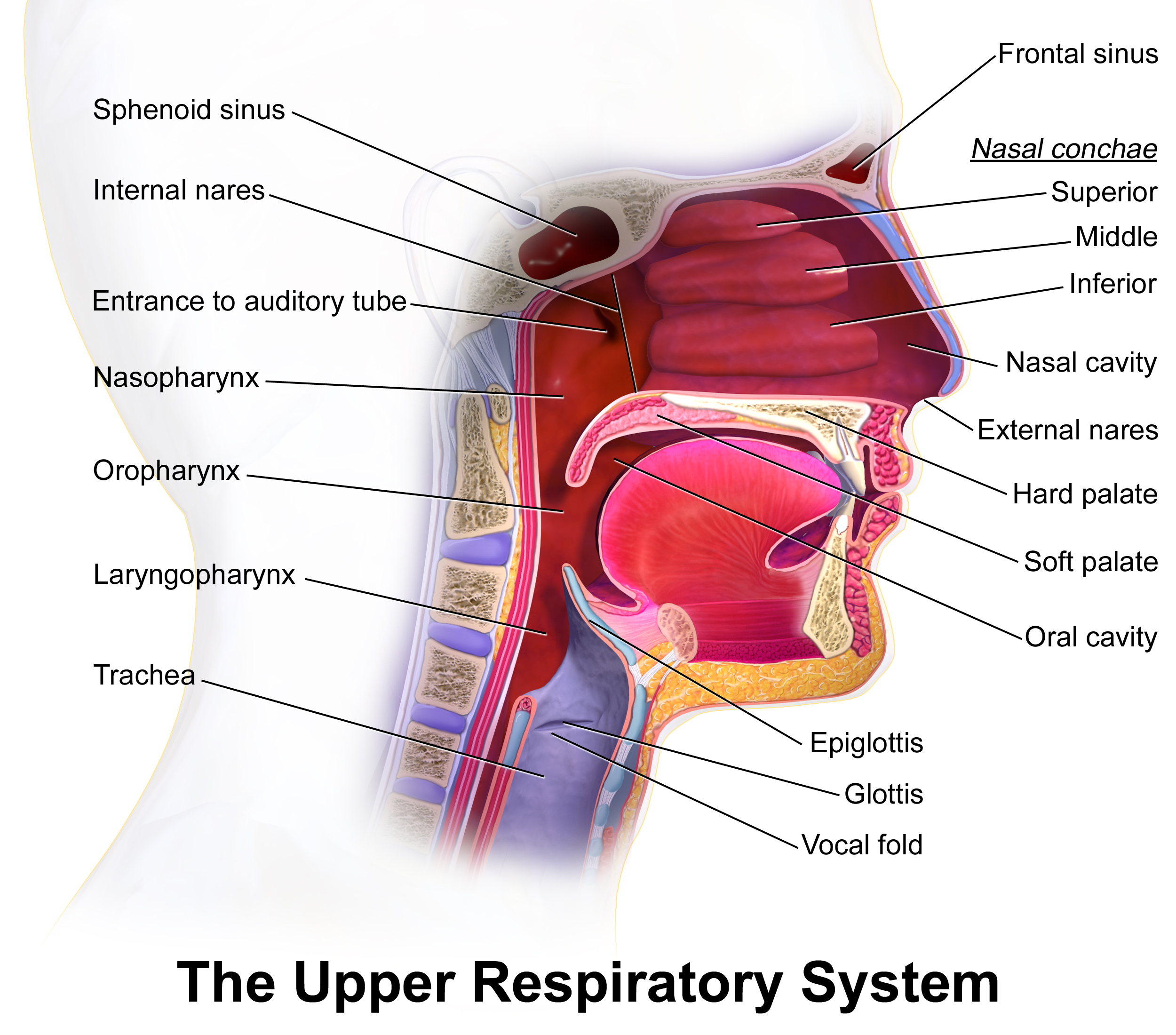
Upper respiratory tract

Snoring has been mathematically modelled wherein the upper airway is a tube which has an elastic or collapsible section. As the section of the upper airway narrows, resistance to the flow of air increases. There is a cyclical obstruction and reopening of the airway at the partially or fully collapsed section as air flows past. This obstruction and reopening occurs at approximately 50 times per second, which causes vibration and noise. The airflow becomes unstable and turbulent.

The structures that obstruct the airway and vibrate are various soft tissue structures at different levels along the upper respiratory tract or aerodigestive tract. These are the uvula, soft palate, faucial pillars (palatoglossal arch, palatopharyngeal arch), palatine tonsils, adenoid tonsil, walls of the pharynx, epiglottis, or lower structures. These structures may relax during sleep and move position, especially under the influence of gravity. This results in partial obstruction (narrowing) or complete obstruction of the airway. Partial obstruction of the airway is more associated with primary snoring, whereas complete obstruction is more a feature of obstructive sleep apnea. The following structures were found to vibrate during snoring: soft palate in 100% of cases, pharynx (53.8%), lateral pharyngeal wall (42.3%), epiglottis (42.3%), and tongue base (26.9%). In primary snoring there may be vibration of the soft palate alone, termed "palatal fluttering". In mild to moderate obstructive sleep apnea, there may be vibration of the palate and lateral pharyngeal wall. In severe obstructive sleep apnea, there may be vibration of the tongue base and epiglottis in addition to the above structures.

The snoring sound mainly occurs during inhalation (breathing in), but it may occur during exhalation (breathing out). Snorers have more negative pressure in their airway, increased inspiratory time, and limitation of respiratory flow. On polysomnography, snoring is usually louder during slow-wave sleep (stage 3 non-rapid eye movement sleep) or rapid eye movement sleep. Snoring in obstructive sleep apnea usually occurs when airflow turbulence is maximum, which is during hyperpnea episodes at the end of apnea events (breathing cessation).

== Causes ==
Snoring (stertor) is often considered according to the location (level) of structure that is causing the obstruction and vibration. However, the sites causing the snoring vary from one person to the next, and the same individual may have multiple different sites which are contributing to the problem. Snoring is usually caused by partial obstruction of the upper airways, at the level of the nasopharynx or oropharynx.

=== Nasal cavity ===
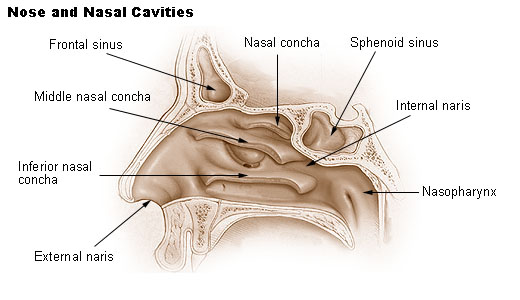
Sagittal section of nasal cavity (nose).

While it is generally not possible for the rigidly supported structures inside the nose to vibrate, the patency of the nasal airway is important in the development of snoring. The nasal cavity causes over 50% of the total airway resistance, particularly at the internal and external nasal valves. The internal nasal valve is located approximately 1.5 cm from the nostril and constitutes the narrowest part of the upper airway. The external nasal valve is the tissue immediately around the nostril. Nasal valve collapse refers to weakening or narrowing of the supporting cartilage at the nasal valves. As per the Hagen–Poiseuille equation, a minimal reduction in the diameter of a tube (in this case the nasal airway) results in an exponential change in airflow. Nasal valve collapse is a cause of snoring.

Nasal congestion (nasal obstruction) reduces sleep quality. Common reasons for nasal obstruction are allergic rhinitis and nonallergic rhinitis. Nasal septum deviation and inferior turbinate hypertrophy (enlargement) are present in almost all cases of snoring and obstructive sleep apnea. Masses in the nasal cavity such as nasal polyps or tumors may also cause snoring.

=== Adenotonsillar hypertrophy ===
Adenoid hypertrophy (enlargement of the adenoid tonsil) and tonsillar hypertrophy (enlargement of the palatine tonsils) is associated with snoring and obstructive sleep apnea, especially in children since the tonsils are larger at younger ages. Adenotonsillar hypertrophy is the most common cause of snoring in children.

=== Mouth ===
Dental problems may be conditions associated with snoring rather than direct causes. Examples include malocclusion, crowding of upper teeth, a narrow palate, and a high-arched palate. Narrow palate and high-arched palate create a predisposition to chronic nasal obstruction.

=== Mouth breathing ===
Mouth breathing frequently accompanies snoring as one of main features of sleep-related breathing disorders (including primary snoring, upper airway resistance syndrome, and obstructive sleep apnea). In one study, 18% of people with mouth breathing reported awareness of snoring.

=== Retrognathia ===
Retrognathia (receded lower jaw) is more common in obstructive sleep apnea than in primary snoring. Micrognathia (small jaw size) is also linked to snoring.

=== Pharynx ===
The muscles of the pharynx relax during sleep, causing partial airway obstruction. The oropharynx is a common site which causes snoring noises.

=== Tongue ===
When sleeping on the back, gravity pulls the tongue backwards and may obstruct the airway. An enlarged tongue, termed macroglossia, is a potential cause for snoring. Obesity may result in increased tongue size. The base of the tongue may be enlarged and cause snoring, e.g. because of a tumor.

=== Larynx and laryngopharynx ===
Problems within the larynx ("voice box") and laryngopharynx may cause snoring, such as laryngeal stenosis or an omega-shaped epiglottis.

=== Obstructive sleep apnea ===
Snoring is one of the cardinal symptoms of obstructive sleep apnea. People who snore are five times more likely to have obstructive sleep apnea compared to those who don't snore. Snoring is common in upper airways resistance syndrome, and obstructive sleep apnea is almost always associated with snoring.

=== Obesity ===
Being obese or overweight increases the amount of fat around the throat. It is not just body mass index that is important, but the circumference of the neck (e.g., collar size more than 42 cm (17 in)) and the size of the tongue. Obesity hypoventilation syndrome also involves snoring.

=== Alcohol ===
Alcohol causes muscle relaxation via its depressant effect on the central nervous system. This muscle relaxation seems to be more pronounced for the tongue, which may then be more prone to obstruct the airway.

=== Muscle relaxants ===
Medications that cause muscle relaxation, such as sedatives and hypnotics, may cause snoring or make it worse. One example is diphenhydramine.

=== Diet ===
Magnesium is a micronutrient which may have a role in maintaining circadian rhythm and sleep quality. There may be a connection between higher magnesium intake and sleep quality, which includes factors such as snoring, daytime sleepiness, and sleep duration. One study supported this connection. Another study showed that 332.5 mg/day magnesium did not have any effect on sleep symptoms such as snoring and sleepiness.

=== Pregnancy ===
Sometimes snoring starts during pregnancy.

=== Hereditary factors ===
Some people have a genetic predisposition to snoring, a proportion of which may be mediated through other heritable lifestyle factors such as body mass index, smoking and alcohol consumption. The DLEU1 gene (part of BCMS) has been linked to snoring.

== Possible consequences ==
Most people with primary snoring do not have any significant health problems as a result of the snoring. Typically, associations with other health conditions are better understood and researched for obstructive sleep apnea than for primary snoring without obstructive sleep apnea.

=== For sleeping partner ===
It is sometimes suggested that snoring is more of a problem for the sleeping partner than the person who snores. Snoring of one partner may cause marital discord, and sometimes has even led to a divorce. The term "snoring spouse syndrome" has been used to describe the health effects for sleeping partners of people with obstructive sleep apnea. Snorers may be unaware of their snoring. It may be difficult for sleeping partners to adjust to the noise because snoring may be irregular, changing in volume and character. This may wake them and prevent them from falling asleep again. Sleeping partners may try to nudge the snorer. This may trigger the snorer to change position, or it may rouse them sufficiently to reduce the muscle relaxation in the upper airway, lessening the snoring. Partners of snorers may use other strategies to minimize the impact of snoring such as earplugs, going to sleep at a different time, or sleeping in a different room.

In one study, treatment of snoring in males (with continuous positive airway pressure) resulted in 13% better sleep efficiency and an average of 1 hour of extra sleep for their female sleeping partners. One hour of lost sleep per day equates to a whole night of lost sleep each week. This may result in chronic sleep deprivation for sleeping partners of snorers. It has also been reported that sleeping partners of snorers may gradually develop hearing loss, although there is little evidence for this. In one small study, sleeping partners had detectable hearing loss in the ear that was habitually facing the snorer.

Parents of children who snore may also suffer reduced sleep quality.

=== Cognitive and psychological ===
Snoring may cause sleep deprivation for snorers. Snoring, even when not associated with obstructive sleep apnea, has been linked to excessive daytime sleepiness. Snoring may cause other problems such as irritability, depression, memory loss, fatigue, lack of focus and decreased libido. It has also been suggested that it increases the risk of road traffic accidents.

In children, snoring may affect growth. It may also affect mood, attention, intelligence, and reduce academic performance at school. Snoring may manifest as behavioral problems, hyperactivity, and impulsivity.

=== Cardiovascular disease ===
Some studies report that there is a higher prevalence of cardiovascular disease in snorers. This includes metabolic syndrome, hypertension (high blood pressure), and atherosclerosis,

There may be up to a 46% increased risk of stroke, and 28% increased risk of coronary artery disease / ischemic heart disease (probably in part explained by snoring with obstructive sleep apnea). Snoring causes increased inspiratory effort. This may increase the circulatory load on the heart. Impaired balance between the sympathetic and parasympathetic nervous system may also be involved. Snoring may cause intermittent hypoxia, oxidative stress, and inflammation. These processes may damage the endothelium (the lining of blood vessels). In addition to the above factors, sleep apnea may cause insulin resistance, dysfunction of endothelium, diabetes, dyslipidemia, and hypertension. However, not all studies report increased risk of cardiovascular disease in those who snore.

There is limited evidence that snoring may cause atherosclerosis of the carotid artery. In research on animals, vibration energy from snoring may be transmitted to the carotid artery. This vibration causes damage to the endothelium. The binding ability of low density lipoprotein may also be increased by acoustic waves. In other words, vibrations from snoring may damage blood vessels, cause formation of atherosclerotic plaque, and also increase the probability that the plaque ruptures. Both non apneic snoring and snoring associated with obstructive sleep apnea have been correlated with carotid atherosclerosis, carotid artery stenosis, and other carotid disease in humans. In one study, snorers had 50% higher chance of carotid stenosis and were more likely to have carotid disease on both the left and right sides.

Snoring that starts during pregnancy may be linked with higher risk of gestational hypertension and preeclampsia.

=== Headaches ===
Snoring is also linked to headaches and migraines, especially headache upon waking. This may be related to cerebral hypoxia, hypercapnia, and temporary increased intra-cranial pressure. Snoring is associated with respiratory event-related arousals, which may be connected with headache.

=== Gastroesophageal reflux disease ===
Snoring and obstructive sleep apnea are associated with higher rates of gastroesophageal reflux disease, including acid reflux which occurs during sleep. There is increased negative pressure in the thoracic cavity during apneic episodes. It was suggested that this negative pressure may overcome the lower esophageal sphincter and allow stomach contents to reflux into the esophagus. However, the lower esophageal sphincter was found to be stronger during obstructed breathing events. Another theory which explains the connection is that snoring and obstructive sleep apnea may promote transient lower esophageal sphincter relaxations. Enlarged tonsils are also seen in gastroesophageal reflux disease, and this may contribute to airway restriction and snoring.

=== Sleep bruxism ===
There is conflicting evidence for and against a possible connection between snoring and sleep bruxism (teeth grinding during sleep). It may be that in snoring and obstructive sleep apnea, there are periods of activation of oropharyngeal muscles. These are necessary to restore patency of the collapsed / obstructed airway. This muscle activity may also trigger activity in the muscles of mastication and hence sleep bruxism.

=== Dry mouth ===
There is limited and contradictory evidence for a connection between snoring and xerostomia (dry mouth). Tissue biopsies of the uvula have been carried out on heavy snorers and people with severe obstructive sleep apnea. The biopsies showed abnormal minor salivary glands. There was increased volume of mucous salivary glands and reduced quantity and volume of serous salivary glands. This may cause reduced production of saliva. Snorers also tend to breathe through their mouths during sleep, in order to get more air. This may have a drying effect in the mouth.

=== Other ===
Nerve damage may occur in the soft palate as a result of chronic trauma from vibration. This leads to morphological changes in the palate.

== Diagnosis ==
Snoring caused by vibration of soft palate

Snoring caused by back of tongue

Snoring with breath holding in association with sleep apnea

According to ICSD-3, primary snoring may diagnosed with the following diagnostic criteria:

- Affected individual or sleeping partner reports breath sounds associated with breathing in during sleep.
- No other sleep disorder that could be causing the snoring.
- Diagnostic investigations such as polysomnography do not show another sleep related respiratory disorder.

Questioning of not just the snorer but also their sleeping partner may be useful in the diagnostic process. The following parameters may be recorded: snoring frequency (less than 3 nights per week or every night), loudness, character (regular or irregular pattern), associated with inhalation or exhalation, and whether the snoring is associated with certain sleeping positions. Any aggravating factors may be identified, such as alcohol, smoking, or nasal congestion. Associated symptoms may be identified, such as insomnia, breathing pauses during sleep, waking with difficulty breathing, dry mouth, daytime sleepiness, and poor concentration. Any history of potentially related conditions may be recorded, such as cardiovascular disease, obesity, and diabetes. It is sometimes useful if the individual or their sleeping partner provides an audio recording of the snoring. Audio recordings may highlight apnea. Palatal snoring (caused by vibration of the soft palate) has an average peak frequency of 137 hertz. Snoring caused by the tongue base has 1243 Hz. Combined palatal and tongue snoring has 190 Hz. Snoring caused by epiglottis has 490 Hz.

Physical examination is normally carried out. The morphology of the facial skeleton is noted. Examination of the nasal cavity may be done with anterior rhinoscopy and nasal endoscopy, which may identify problems inside the nose such as deviated septum, hypertrophic inferior turbinate, or nasal polyps. The mouth and teeth are also examined. The oropharynx may be examined with flexible transnasal endoscope (through the nose) or rigid transoral endoscope (through the mouth). If laryngeal snoring is suspected, laryngoscopy or drug-induced sleep endoscopy may be carried out. The latter investigation enables examination of the upper respiratory tract while the patient is unconscious. Bronchoscopy may also be carried out.

To diagnose primary snoring, it is necessary first to rule out obstructive sleep apnea and all other sleep-related respiratory disorders. This usually requires an overnight sleep study (polysomnography), which is the gold standard in investigation and diagnosis of sleep disorders. A sleep study includes calculation of the apnea–hypopnea index, and measurement of many other parameters such as the total number of snoring events, flow limitations without snoring (indicates nasal obstruction), and flow limitation with snoring (indicates obstruction from palate and tongue base). Home sleep apnea test is another option, allowing calculation of apnea-hypopnea index and respiratory disturbance index and differentiation between primary snoring and obstructive sleep apnea.

Other investigations may sometimes be done, such as nasal function testing (e.g., rhinomanometry), pharyngeal manometry, allergy testing, acoustic analysis, or medical imaging.

== Treatment ==
Almost all treatments for snoring revolve around lessening the noise and improving air flow by reducing the blockage in the airway.

=== Lifestyle modification ===
Lifestyle changes are a first-line treatment to stop snoring. Recommended lifestyle changes include stopping smoking, avoiding alcohol before bedtime, and sleeping on the side (lateral position). Sleeping on the side reduces the tendency for the base of tongue to fall back and obstruct the airway. This occurs when sleeping on the back (supine position) since gravity pulls the tongue backwards in this position. Losing weight reduces the amount of fat that compresses the airway. Even a modest amount of weight loss, such as 4.5 kg (10 lbs) can improve snoring.

Improving sleep hygiene may be beneficial. Examples include establishing fixed routines for bedtime and wake up time, including on weekends. Relaxation before sleep may help people get to sleep more quickly. Applications for smartphones and smartwatches are available. They often record snoring during sleep, compare snoring severity over time, and give advice to users. Some apps trigger a sound or vibration when the person starts to snore. Many over-the-counter snoring treatments, such as stop-snoring rings or wrist-worn electrical stimulation bands, have no scientific evidence to support their claims.

=== Nasal strips and dilators ===
Many types of nasal strips, nose clips, and internal dilators are available to temporarily prevent nasal valve collapse. They are all designed to stent and expand the internal nasal valve.

=== Orthopedic pillows ===
Orthopedic pillows are designed to support the head and neck in a way that ensures the jaw stays open and slightly forward. This helps keep the airways unrestricted as possible and in turn leads to reduced snoring. A pillow that was designed to change the position of the head was found to reduce snoring intensity both subjective and objectively (with polysomnography).

=== Medications ===
Medications are usually not helpful in treating snoring symptoms, though they can help control some of the underlying causes such as nasal congestion and allergic reactions. Corticosteroid nasal sprays and drops can reduce inflammation in nasal mucosa and reduce the size of the adenoid, thereby reducing symptoms of obstructive sleep apnea such as snoring. Montelukast has also been used in the same application. Systemic medication and oils and sprays for the mouth are not recommended. A temporary period of nasal decongestants may allow for simulation of the potential effect of surgery on the nasal concha in that individual. Medications that aggravate snoring such as sedatives may be avoided before bedtime, or they may be substituted for weaker alternatives.

=== Myofunctional therapy (oropharyngeal exercises) ===
Myofunctional therapy (also termed myofascial therapy) incorporates oropharyngeal (mouth and throat) and tongue exercises. The exercises are usually combinations of isotonic and isometric exercises involving different muscles of the soft palate, tongue, face, pharynx, jaw, and upper respiratory tract. Pronouncing vowel sounds activates muscles in the soft palate and uvula. Tongue exercises may involve movement of the tongue in different directions, sticking out the tongue, and pressing the tongue against hard and soft tissue surfaces in the mouth. Facial exercises may involve pushing out the cheek with a finger while puckering, closing, or moving the lips. Jaw exercises may involve chewing and opening and closing the mouth. Pharyngeal exercises may involve swallowing. Other exercises include sucking through a narrow straw and blowing up balloons. Myofunctional therapy is theorized to improve the tone and positioning of the muscles. The exercises may promote a closed mouth breathing position where the tongue is in contact with the palate. This may create negative pressure in the mouth, leading to a stabilization of patency of the pharynx and reduced muscular effort required to keep the airway open.

There is conflicting evidence for the effectiveness of myofunctional therapy in snoring. One systematic review found that myofunctional therapy reduces snoring in adults based on both subjective questionnaires and objective sleep studies. Snoring intensity was reduced by 51%. Time spent snoring was reduced by 31% as measured by polysomnography. One study used objective measurement of snoring (audio recordings) and found that myofunctional therapy had little to no effect in reducing snoring frequency. Another study reported that myofunctional therapy had a possible reduction in snoring frequency and intensity (measured subjectively) compared to sham therapy (placebo). When myofunctional therapy combined with CPAP is compared to myofunctional therapy alone, there may be little to no difference. There is insufficient evidence to recommend myofunctional therapy for snoring in adults. Myofunctional therapy may be more useful in children who snore than in adults.

=== Dental appliances ===
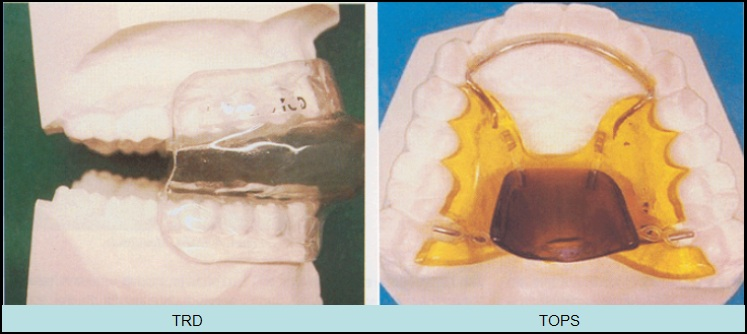
One style of mandibular advancement splint

Dental appliances are common treatments for snoring. They may be custom made, which requires an impression of the teeth and construction in a dental laboratory, or they may be bought over the counter without involvement of a dental health professional. The latter type are often "boil and bite" appliances which come in a set size. The appliance is immersed in boiling water and then the individual bites into appliance with the jaw in a protruded position. Oral appliances may be titratable (adjustable) or non-titratable (one fixed position). In general, oral appliances are cheap and non-invasive. They can be combined with CPAP treatment. Complications include discomfort, excessive salivation (drooling), insomnia, pain in the periodontal ligament of teeth if they are under excessive force, pain in the temporomandibular joint and muscles of mastication (e.g. temporalis), and jaw dislocation. Some devices prevent anterior oral seal, and therefore cause mouth breathing with the associated problems like dry mouth. A device which covers only some of the teeth and leaves others uncovered may potentially have a Dahl effect, leading to undesired movement of the teeth and creating problems like open bite. Therefore, a dentist should regularly review individuals who are using dental appliances for snoring.

Mandibular advancement splints (mandibular repositioning splints) push the lower jaw forwards. The tongue has muscular connections to the mandible and therefore is pulled forwards at the same time, which prevents obstruction of the airway at the oropharynx. This is a similar mechanism to the jaw-thrust maneuver used to maintain patency of a supine patient in first aid. In addition, mandibular advancement splints increase the tension in the soft palate and pharyngeal walls. Mandibular advancement splints are used for snoring and for mild to moderate obstructive sleep apnea. They may be useful for people with retrognathia (receded lower jaw). Mandibular advancement splints are better tolerated than CPAP. They can reduce snoring loudness and improve quality of life of snorers and their sleeping partners.

Tongue repositioning (retaining) devices are made of soft acrylic and cover the upper and lower teeth and create a seal with the lips. They have a "bulb" or "bubble" which sticks out the front of the mouth. This creates negative suction pressure, holding the tongue in a forward position and increasing the airway space behind the tongue. Soft-palate lifters are devices which lift the soft palate. They are useful for people who have weak muscles in the region.

=== Orthodontic treatment ===
Orthodontic treatment may improve some dental problems associated with snoring, such as a narrow palate.

=== Positive airway pressure ===
Continuous positive airway pressure (CPAP) is a machine which pumps air through a flexible hose to a mask worn over the mouth, nose, or both. The pressure of the air keeps the airway open. CPAP is considered the gold standard treatment for obstructive sleep apnea. It has been shown to reduce snoring associated with obstructive sleep apnea. However, CPAP can be uncomfortable, and many people stop using it. This is especially true for primary snoring.

=== Surgery ===
Surgical procedures outside the nose and soft palate for treatment of primary snoring have been discouraged. Many different surgical procedures have been used for snoring, including:

- Nasal surgeries, e.g. septoplasty, turbinoplasty, various procedures for nasal valve collapse (spreader grafts, spreader flaps, butterfly grafts, batten grafts).
- Palatal surgeries, e.g. uvulopalatopharyngoplasty (most commonly performed procedure for snoring), palatal implants (pillar procedure), somnoplasty (may combine other sites)
- Adenoidectomy or tonsillectomy (or combined, termed adenotonsillectomy).
- Tongue base surgeries
- Hypopharyngeal surgery
- Orthognathic surgery, e.g. maxillary mandibular advancement
- Hypoglossal nerve stimulation
- Tracheostomy
- Bariatric surgery

== Epidemiology ==
Snoring is one of the most common sleep disorders. The reported prevalence of snoring varies significantly depending on the population studied, and because there is no universally accepted definition of snoring. Occasional snoring is almost universally present in humans. Habitual (primary snoring) is less common but still a common problem.

Snoring affects 2.6–83% of males and 1.5–71% of females. Snoring is more common in males than females. In research about obstructive sleep apnea, it was found that the upper airway is longer and more collapsible in males, and that fat is distributed differently in males and females

Snoring is more common in older people. However, after age 70, awareness of snoring decreases. This is possibly related to hearing loss. Snoring also has positive correlations with larger body-mass index, lower socio-economic status, and more frequent smoking and alcohol consumption. Snoring affects about 8–12% of children.

== Society and culture ==
There are descriptions of snoring in the fifteenth century. Uvulopalatopharyngoplasty was proposed in 1964 by Ikematsu as a treatment for snoring. CPAP was first used for snoring and obstructive sleep apnea in 1981. Compared to obstructive sleep apnea, primary snoring has received less attention in research.

Snoring is sometimes not considered as a medical condition by medical insurance companies, meaning that treatments may not be covered by insurance.

"Zzz" is a common onomatopeic representation of snoring. It may have developed from use in comics.
