= Adenoiditis =

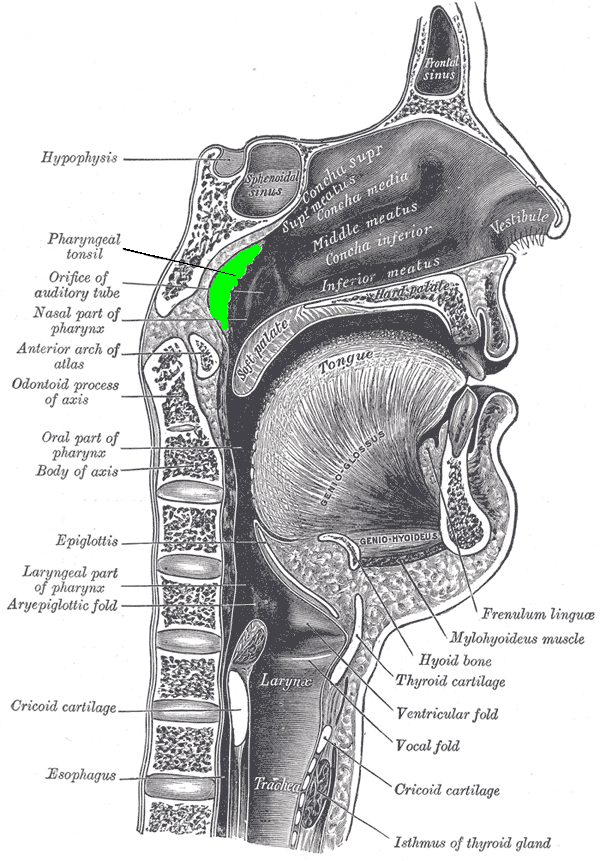
- Location of the adenoid
- Specialty: Otorhinolaryngology

Adenoiditis is the inflammation of the adenoid tissue usually caused by an infection. Adenoiditis is treated using medication (antibiotics and/or steroids) or surgical intervention.

Adenoiditis may produce cold-like symptoms. However, adenoiditis symptoms often persist for ten or more days, and often include pus-like discharge from nose.

The infection cause is usually viral. However, if the adenoiditis is caused by a bacterial infection, antibiotics may be prescribed for treatment. A steroidal nasal spray may also be prescribed in order to reduce nasal congestion. Severe or recurring adenoiditis may require surgical removal of the adenoids (adenotonsillectomy).

== Signs and symptoms ==
Acute adenoiditis is characterized by fever, runny nose, nasal airway obstruction resulting in predominantly oral breathing, snoring and sleep apnea, Rhinorrhea with serous secretion in viral forms and mucous-purulent secretion in bacterial forms. In cases due to viral infection symptoms usually recede spontaneously after 48 hours, symptoms of bacterial adenoiditis typically persist up to a week. Adenoiditis is sometimes accompanied by tonsillitis. Repeated adenoiditis may lead to enlarged adenoids.

=== Complications ===
Complications of acute adenoiditis can occur due to extension of inflammation to the neighboring organs.

== Cause ==
Viruses that may cause adenoiditis include adenovirus, rhinovirus and paramyxovirus. Bacterial causes include Streptococcus pyogenes, Streptococcus pneumoniae, Moraxella catarrhalis and various species of Staphylococcus including Staphylococcus aureus.

== Pathophysiology ==
It is currently believed that bacterial biofilms play an integral role in the harboring of chronic infection by tonsil and adenoid tissue so contributing to recurrent sinusitis and recurrent or persistent ear disease. Also, enlarged adenoids and tonsils may lead to the obstruction of the breathing patterns in children, causing apnea during sleep.

The most common bacteria isolated are Haemophilus influenzae, group A beta-hemolytic Streptococcus, Staphylococcus aureus, Moraxella catarrhalis, and Streptococcus pneumoniae. Haemophilus influenzae, Moraxella catarrhalis and Streptococcus pneumoniae are the three most resistant pathogens of otitis and rhinosinusitis in children with these diseases.

== Diagnosis ==
Optical fiber endoscopy can confirm the diagnosis in case of doubt, directly visualizing the inflamed adenoid.

== Treatment ==
In cases of viral adenoiditis, treatment with analgesics or antipyretics is often sufficient. Bacterial adenoiditis may be treated with antibiotics, such as amoxicillin - clavulanic acid or a cephalosporin. In case of adenoid hypertrophy, adenoidectomy may be performed to remove the adenoid.

== Epidemiology ==
Adenoiditis occurs mainly in childhood, often associated with acute tonsillitis. Incidence decreases with age, with adenoiditis being rare in children over 15 years due to physiological atrophy of the adenoid tissue.

== See also ==
- Tonsillitis
