= Pregnancy and sleep =

Sleep during pregnancy can be influenced by various physiological, hormonal, and psychological factors, leading to changes in sleep duration and quality. Furthermore, pregnant persons are more prone to experiencing sleep disorders like insomnia, sleep-disordered breathing, and restless legs syndrome. Most women experience sleep disturbances during pregnancy. Interrupted sleep is recognized for its substantial impact on health and its association with a heightened risk of unfavorable pregnancy outcomes.

== Aetiology ==
=== Anatomic and metabolic changes ===
Pregnancy brings about significant and dynamic physiological changes that can impact sleep and contribute to sleep disorders. These changes encompass structural alterations that may affect the length and quality of sleep, disrupt breathing during sleep, and metabolic shifts that raise the risk of restless legs syndrome. For example, conditions like gastroesophageal reflux tend to worsen as pregnancy advances, affecting a substantial portion of pregnant individuals and potentially causing sleep disruptions. Frequent nighttime urination due to increased sodium excretion can also fragment sleep. Additionally, the musculoskeletal system undergoes stress as it readies itself for the expanding uterus and eventual delivery, which can lead to sleep disturbances. Alterations in iron and folate metabolism during pregnancy have been proposed as factors contributing to the higher prevalence of restless legs syndrome among expectant mothers.

=== Hormones ===
The secretion of sex hormones like estrogen and progesterone increases significantly during pregnancy, influencing the regulation of sleep in terms of both circadian rhythms and sleep need. Sleep disruption can also occur due to nighttime uterine contractions, which are a result of the nighttime surge in oxytocin levels.

== Sleep disorders ==
Sleep disorders are frequently experienced during pregnancy, impacting over 50% of all pregnancies. These issues tend to become more prevalent as pregnancy advances. The most commonly observed sleep disorders in pregnant women include insomnia, obstructive sleep apnea, and restless legs syndrome. The American Academy of Sleep Medicine has officially recognized 'pregnancy-associated sleep disorder' as a distinct condition, encompassing both insomnia and increased daytime sleepiness occurring during pregnancy.

=== Parasomnias ===
Parasomnias represent a notable concern in pregnancy, with somnambulism, nightmares, night terrors, and vivid dreams being frequent occurrences. The disrupted sleep experienced during pregnancy, along with sleep disorders like sleep-disordered breathing and movement disorders, can act as substantial triggers for parasomnias, leading to an elevated likelihood of experiencing such episodes during pregnancy.

=== Insomnia ===
Pregnancy-related insomnia is quite common. As pregnancy advances, both subjective and objective assessments reveal a notable increase in sleep disruptions. Researchers who have used polysomnography to study sleep in pregnant women have observed distinct patterns. These patterns include more wakefulness after initially falling asleep, reduced rapid eye movement sleep, and a greater amount of time spent in lighter sleep stages compared to non-pregnant women. Furthermore, as pregnancy progresses, women tend to experience less total sleep time, increased wakefulness after falling asleep, more time in lighter sleep stages, decreased periods of deep and rapid eye movement sleep, and more frequent awakenings compared to earlier stages of pregnancy. Additionally, it's common for pregnant persons to express dissatisfaction with the quality of their sleep, with almost half reporting poor subjective sleep experiences.

=== Restless legs syndrome ===
Restless legs syndrome is a condition characterized by uncomfortable sensations in the legs and an irresistible urge to move them, particularly during periods of rest or inactivity.

The condition is more common among pregnant women than in the general population. Research studies have reported varying prevalence rates, with estimates ranging from 10% to 34% of pregnant individuals experiencing RLS symptoms at some point during their pregnancy.

=== Sleep-disordered breathing ===
Snoring and sleep-disordered breathing are significantly more common in pregnant women, being 2–3 times more prevalent than in nonpregnant females. These changes are associated with alterations in upper airway anatomy and tend to return to nonpregnant levels after childbirth.

Obstructive sleep apnea is a condition where breathing repeatedly stops during sleep due to the collapse of the upper airway, often leading to a decrease in oxygen levels. It is a prevalent health concern among pregnant women and is linked to various pregnancy-related health consequences. The condition is more prevalent in pregnant women who are obese. Pregnancies where obstructive sleep apnea is a complicating factor face a higher risk of developing conditions like intrauterine growth restriction, pre-eclampsia, and stillbirth.

=== Management ===
The management of sleep disorders during pregnancy may require the use of psychopharmacological drugs. Primary insomnia can be managed with cognitive behavioral therapy and medication, while secondary insomnia should primarily target the underlying medical issue. When dealing with restless legs syndrome, treatment includes medication use and minimizing exposure to triggers like smoking, caffeine, and specific medications.

== Risks ==
Research indicates that maternal sleep duration during pregnancy is associated with adverse pregnancy outcomes, with both short and long sleep durations linked to gestational diabetes mellitus (GDM). Optimal sleep duration of 7–9 hours is generally recommended. Some studies found that poor sleep quality raises the risk of preterm birth, however, a meta analysis found that the association was not significant.

== Sleeping positions ==
The National Health Service (NHS) advises pregnant individuals to sleep on their side, either the left or right, for optimal safety during pregnancy. Research indicates that beyond the 28th week, assuming a supine (back) sleeping position can result in a twofold increase in the risk of stillbirth. This increased risk may be attributed to potential disruptions in fetal blood circulation and oxygen supply. Sleeping on the back can also give rise to various complications, including back pain, respiratory issues, hemorrhoidal problems, low blood pressure, gastrointestinal discomfort, and reduced blood flow to both the maternal heart and the developing fetus. Furthermore, the weight gain associated with pregnancy may heighten the likelihood of developing sleep apnea when sleeping on the back.

== Dreams ==
During pregnancy, a significant period of emotional adjustment occurs, involving thoughts, feelings, and relationships regarding oneself and the unborn child, which often find expression in dreams. Pregnant women often describe their dreams as exceptionally vivid and realistic. Some systematic studies suggest that the majority of pregnant women (67–88%) report experiencing at least one dream related to topics like pregnancy, childbirth, or babies. Additionally, some other studies indicate that 30–62% of these dreams include maternal elements, and their frequency tends to increase as pregnancy progresses. These dreams typically touch upon the mother's physical well-being and the baby's sex, but may also feature elements of danger or harm to the baby, mother, father, as well as issues within the family and marriage. Pregnant individuals tend to have better dream recall, and notably, the content of their dreams tends to be more disturbing compared to other life stages. Comparative research suggests that pregnant persons recall more dreams centered around pregnancy-related themes (e.g., childbirth, pregnancy, the fetus, their own body, the baby's body) and more elements involving potential risks to the fetus and themselves. Pregnancy can influence dream patterns, leading to an increased likelihood of experiencing bad dreams and nightmares. Pregnant women's dreams tend to be more masochistic and include more elements where they experience misfortune, harm, or face environmental threats, although they do not necessarily involve more aggressive actions.
