= Nasopharyngoscopy =

Examination of the back of the throat through the nose

A nasopharyngoscopy is a surgical procedure performed to examine the nose and throat. It is performed using a fiberoptic instrument called a flexible fiberoptic nasopharyngoscope, that is inserted through the nose in order to examine both it, and the back of the throat. It is typically used to identify a variety of conditions including nasal septal deviation, polyps, and edema, and the causes of conditions including nosebleeds and sore throat. This procedure can be combined with the intentional application of intrathoracic pressure to perform a procedure known as Müller's maneuver. It is often used to examine cases of obstructive sleep apnea, and is often favorable to other procedures as it does not require exposure to radiation, can be performed while the patient is sitting or in the supine position, can both be performed while the patient is asleep or awake, and is inexpensive. However, it is an invasive procedure, which may make it unfavorable to some. It is also often used to evaluate children with stridor. In other cases, it can be used to evaluate and diagnose cases of nasopharyngeal cancer, often in addition to a biopsy.

== See also ==
- Nasoendoscopy
- Laryngoscopy
- Otorhinolaryngology
- Müller's maneuver
