= Nasal valve collapse =

Condition of the structure of the nose

Nasal valve collapse is a condition where airflow through the nose is restricted due to the narrowing or collapse of the nasal valves. Obstruction through the nasal valves can be classified as static or dynamic. Static obstruction results from a structural narrowing of the valve. Dynamic obstruction is the collapse of a weak nasal valve due to pressure differences. Diagnosis is based on clinical examination and the specialized Cottle maneuver. Management can include conservative treatment, but most patients are referred for surgery.

== Anatomy and Physiology ==
Mink first described nasal valves in 1903 as a region in the nasal vestibule bound by the septum medially and the limen nasi laterally. As time went on, it was discovered that there were two valves.

The internal nasal valve is formed by the nasal septum (medial), lower edge of upper lateral cartilage (lateral), and inferior turbinate (inferior). It is the narrowest part of the nasal airway, and therefore, in most people, it is responsible for the most resistance to airflow.

The external nasal valve, also known as the entry point of the nasal airway, is formed by the columella and medial footplate (medial), the alar rim (lateral), and posterior internal nasal valve. The external nasal valve is the section of the lateral wall of the nose that collapses with forced inspiration.

== Classification and Pathophysiology ==
Nasal valve obstruction can be either static or dynamic, with dynamic obstruction directly correlating with nasal valve collapse. Static obstruction is the narrowing of the angle between the upper nasal septum and the lateral walls of the nasal valves, it does not always involve collapsing of the lateral walls. This most commonly occurs due to structural abnormalities such as a deviated septum or scarring from previous surgery.

Dynamic obstruction typically occurs when the external nasal valve is flexible or weakened. During inspiration, the pressure difference between the inside and outside of the nasal passage causes the valve to collapse. Another name for dynamic obstruction is lateral nasal wall insufficiency. As inspiratory pressure increases with inspiration, the lateral wall of the external nasal valve can collapse if it is too weak, due to Bernoulli's principle.

The lateral nasal wall often becomes thinner with age, leading to a weaker external nasal valve. Weakness or dysfunction of the nasal muscles can cause a decrease in the lateral nasal wall tension, which can cause dynamic collapse of the external nasal valve. Nasal surgical procedures, such as rhinoplasty and septoplasty, along with nasal trauma, can also be predisposing factors to nasal valve collapse.

== Diagnosis ==
Nasal valve collapse is diagnosed clinically with examination by a medical provider. The clinician will first observe the shape of the nose at rest and with forced inspiration. If the lower lateral cartilage collapses, an external nasal valve collapse or obstruction is likely.

The modified Cottle maneuver is now widely used and is done using a tool to either stabilize the lateral nasal wall or lateralize it, push the wall more lateral than it should be. If airflow improves simply by stabilizing the nasal wall, it is likely due to dynamic external valve collapse. If airflow improves only when the nasal wall is pushed even more laterally, it’s likely a static valve collapse.

It is important to remember that static and dynamic obstructions can often coexist in patients, so it is important to determine exactly where the collapse occurs and look for any nasal deformities or pathologic obstructions. Nasal endoscopy may be performed to evaluate structural contributors such as septal deviation or turbinate hypertrophy.

Computed tomography (CT) is not able to measure dynamic collapse and is therefore unhelpful for nasal valve collapse, but can be used to diagnose other nasal pathologies.

== Management ==
Nasal valve collapse can be managed with non-surgical or surgical interventions. Non-surgical interventions include internal and external nasal dilators. Both options are noninvasive and available over the counter. External nasal dilators, more commonly called nasal strips, will stick to the outside of the nose to expand the internal nasal valve. Internal nasal dilators are inserted into the nasal passage to support both the internal nasal valve and external nasal valve.

Most patients with nasal valve collapse are sent for surgical referral and many undergo surgery because more conservative measures do not provide enough relief. The surgeon will then choose the procedure based on the location and classification of the nasal valve dysfunction. Most surgical techniques for external nasal valve collapse will aim to stabilize the lateral wall of the nose while also widening the dome of the nose.

In some cases, surgically treating causes of static nasal obstruction can be enough to treat the external nasal valve collapse without surgically supporting the lateral nasal wall as well.

More non-invasive treatments, such as the bioabsorbable nasal implants Latera and bipolar radiofrequency device Aerin have both shown promising results in treating nasal valve collapse, but more studies with larger patient populations are still needed to show how beneficial they are.
