= Tornwaldt's disease =

Thronwaldt's disease
- Specialty: ENT surgery

Tornwaldt's disease is the inflammation or abscess of the embryonic cyst of pharyngeal bursa. It is located in the midline of the posterior wall of the nasopharynx. It is covered anteriorly by mucosa in the adenoid mass. It is bounded posteriorly by longus muscle.

== Signs and symptoms ==
The symptoms usually appear when there is inflammation of pharyngeal bursa causing Tornwaldt cyst. This is caused by spontaneous drainage in the nasopharyngeal cavity or because of involvement of nervous plexus. The symptoms are occipital headache, cough, middle ear effusion, cervical myalgia, and halitosis, i.e. bad breath. When there is an enlargement of the cyst, it causes symptoms like nasal obstruction, post-nasal discharge with foul-smelling odour, blockage of the Eustachian tube causing otalgia and secretory otitis media, retro-orbital pain.

== Cause ==
Tornwaldt's disease is caused by many different causative agents of stimulus. This includes excessive alcohol and tobacco, which causes a decrease in local immune resistance so the pathogenic microbes take advantage, leading to the disease. Frequent contact with high temperature, malnutrition, chronic heart disease, kidney disease, joint disease, poor living and working conditions and contact with dust and harmful gases leads to Tornwaldt's disease.

== Pathogenesis ==
Tornwaldt's disease is a rare benign disorder caused by persistent notochord remnants. This disease almost remains asymptomatic. At about the 10th week of embryonic development, the pharyngeal pouch forms by adhesion of the pharyngeal ectoderm to the cranial end of the notochord. This become closed at the orifice or crusts adhere to the orifice without closing. The contact between these remnants and pharyngeal ectoderm leads to the growth of respiratory epithelium. This forms Tornwaldt's bursa which drains into the nasopharyngeal cavity. This only forms a cyst when the orifice is partially or completely obstructed by infection. A Tornwaldt's cyst progresses to Tornwaldt's disease only after infection or inflammation occurs.

== Diagnosis ==
A CT scan shows a solid mass of Tornwaldt's cyst and MRI shows a glass-shaped lesion with fluid on the upper part of the posterior nasopharyngeal wall. Additionally, a cystic mass in the upper part of the nasopharyngeal wall and mucopurulent discharge from upper part of the mass can be seen on nasal endoscopy. Among them MRI is the best for diagnosing the Tornwaldt's cyst.

== Treatment ==
Antibiotics are given to treat the infection. If there is a large symptomatic lesion, surgery by transnasal endoscopic marsupialisation is the treatment option because it is safe, fast and provides good visualization during surgery. For small lesions, the endonasal approach is recommended.

== History ==
Tornwaldt's disease was noted by Mayer in 1840. He noted it in an autopsy specimen but founded as a pathologic entity by German physician Gustavus L. Tornwaldt in 1855. Only a few cases have been reported in Japan between 1929 and 1992. In 2008–2009, six patients were diagnosed to have nasopharyngeal bursitis, of which four were male and two female.

== See also ==
- Tornwaldt cyst
