= Sleep position =

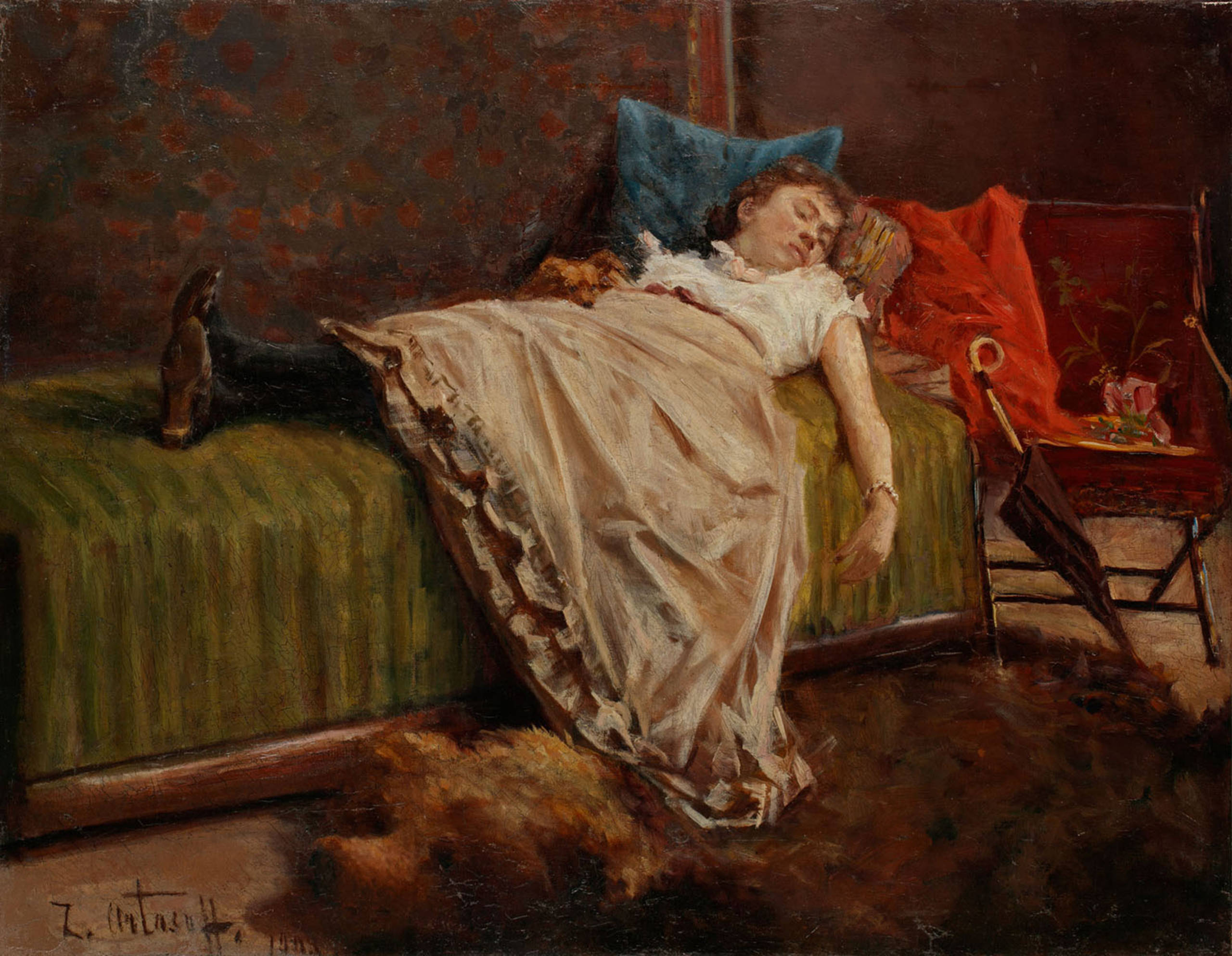
Sleeping Girl by Lazar Artasoff (1903)

A sleep position is the body configuration assumed by a person during or prior to sleeping.

The topic of sleep position has been covered throughout history and has produced a variety of studies, research papers, books, etc. The general consensus is that depending on a multitude of factors such as age and physical as well as mental wellness, someone's sleep position can pose positive or negative effects. Extensive research has been done through tracking sleep clinically as well as surveying the general population. From the data, scientists have proposed several "optimal" and "sub-optimal" sleep positions depending on said persons mental or physical issues. The most researched and mentioned sleep positions are the lateral (side sleeping, often in a fetal or semi-fetal configuration), supine (faced upwards), and prone (faced downwards) positions, as those positions come naturally when trying to sleep.

== Sleeping preferences ==
The most common sleeping position in adults is the lateral position, followed by the supine and then prone position. The lateral position preference tends to increase with age and body mass index (BMI). This may be explained by physiological intolerance to the supine position, causing more awakenings and arousals during sleep than the lateral position.

A Canadian survey found that 39% of respondents preferred to sleep in the "log" position (lying on one's side with the arms down the side) whilst 28% preferred to sleep on their side with their legs bent.

A young adult male sleeping in a prone position

== Effects on health ==
=== In infants ===
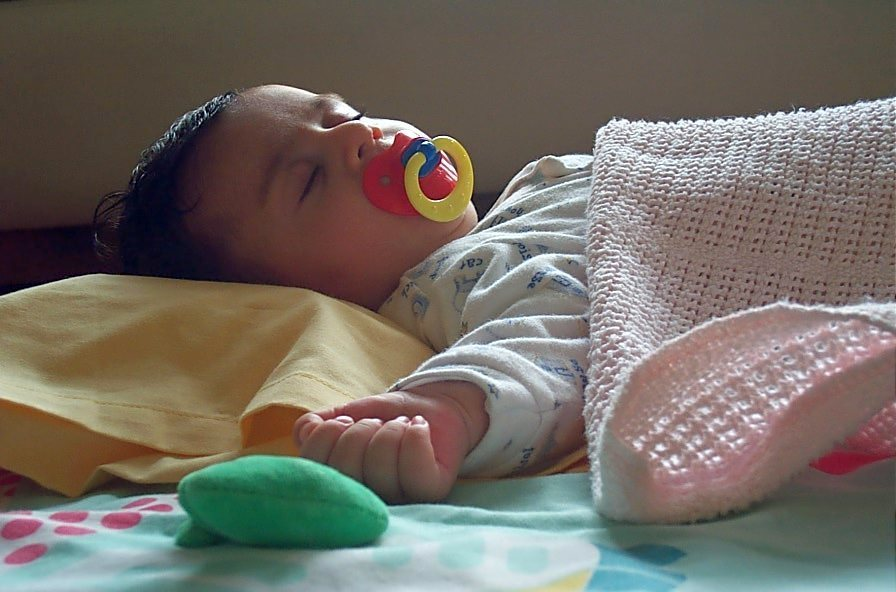
A baby sleeping on its back

In the 1958 edition of his best-selling book The Common Sense Book of Baby and Child Care, pediatrician Dr Benjamin Spock warned against placing a baby on its back, writing, "if [an infant] vomits, he's more likely to choke on the vomitus." However, later studies have shown that placing a young baby in a face-down prone position increases the risk of sudden infant death syndrome (SIDS). A 2005 study concluded that "systematic review of preventable risk factors for SIDS from 1970 would have led to earlier recognition of the risks of sleeping on the front and might have prevented over 10,000 infant deaths in the UK and at least 50,000 in Europe, the USA, and Australasia."

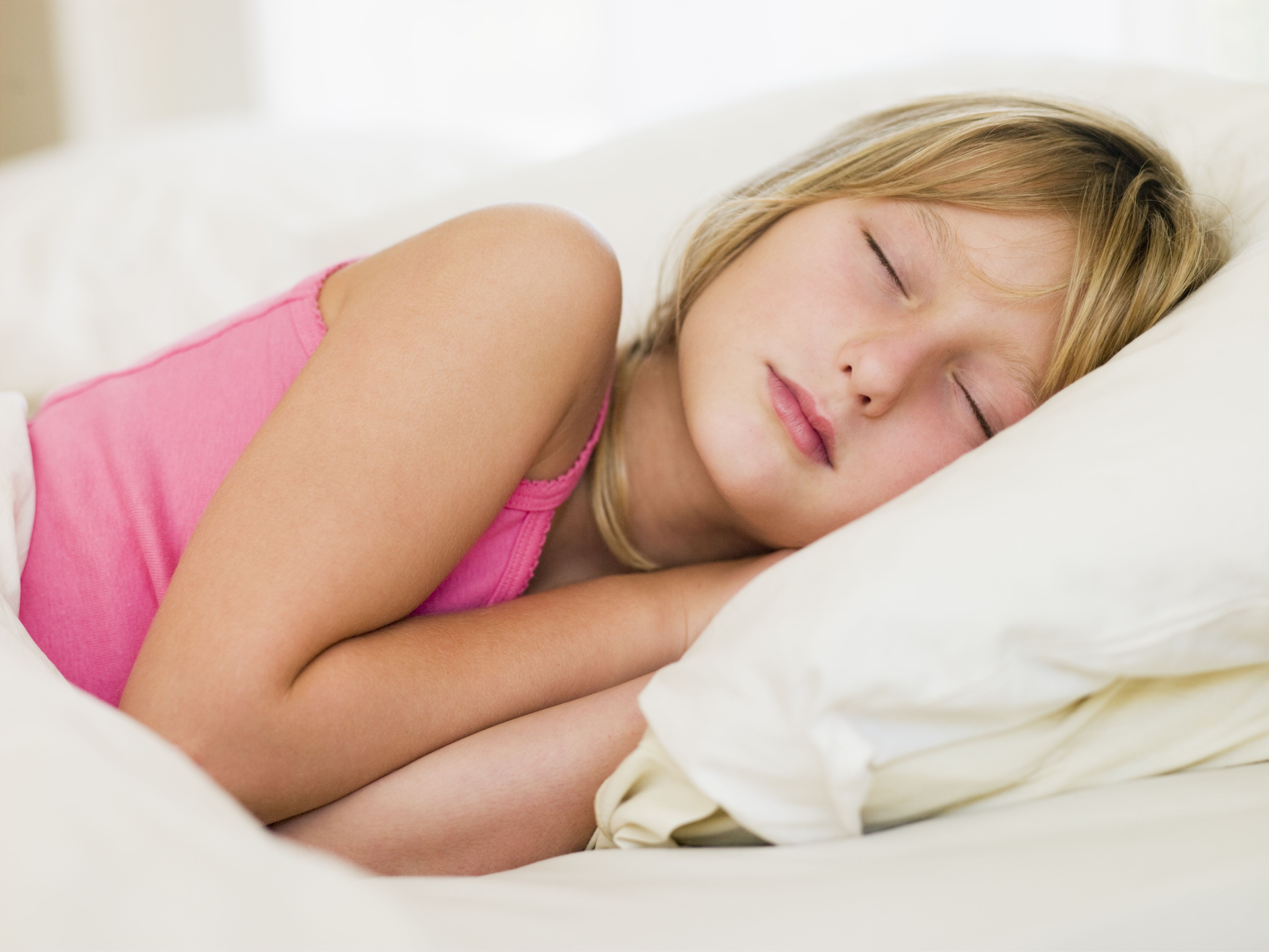
Sleep disorders can be partially treated with a change in sleep position.

=== Sleep Apnea ===
Obstructive sleep apnea (OSA) that can be addressed by a change in sleep position, most commonly by avoiding the supine position, is called positional obstructive sleep apnea (POSA), which accounts for 56-75% of regular OSA patients. One of the treatments for POSA is positional therapy (PT), in which patients are influenced to avoid sleeping on their back. The avoidance of the supine position is to prevent gravity from pulling the tongue into a position that can cause airway blockages. In cases where apnea is not exclusive to the supine position, PT alone can be insufficient and other treatments are considered. Snoring, which may be (but is not necessarily) an indicator of OSA, may also be alleviated using PT.

=== Glymphatic system clearance ===
The glymphatic system, responsible for metabolic waste removal from the brain, is affected by sleep position. Animal studies have shown that glymphatic activity is highest during lateral sleep and lowest during prone sleep. This has led to the hypothesis that the natural preference for lateral sleeping positions in mammals, including humans, is to ensure proper glymphatic function.

=== Gastroesophageal reflux ===
The right lateral sleeping position results in much more reflux in the night than the left lateral position and prone position. This is due to the stomach's position and esophageal sphincter relaxation. Lying in the left lateral position is generally accepted to be ideal for managing the symptoms of GERD by reducing acid clearance time and acid exposure time. A similar phenomena, laryngopharyngeal reflux, occurs from lying supine soon after eating food that relax the lower esophageal sphincter. Elevating the head has been found to reduce esophageal acid exposure and acid clearance time.

=== Sleep paralysis ===
Sleeping in the supine position has been linked to an increased occurrence of sleep paralysis. The position taken while falling asleep is not linked to actual sleep paralysis events, just the eventual sleep position while experiencing REM disruption. Reoccurring sleep paralysis can be treated using sleep position training.

== See also ==
- Lying (position)
- Sex position
