= Tornwaldt cyst =

Benign cyst which grows within the throat (nasopharynx)

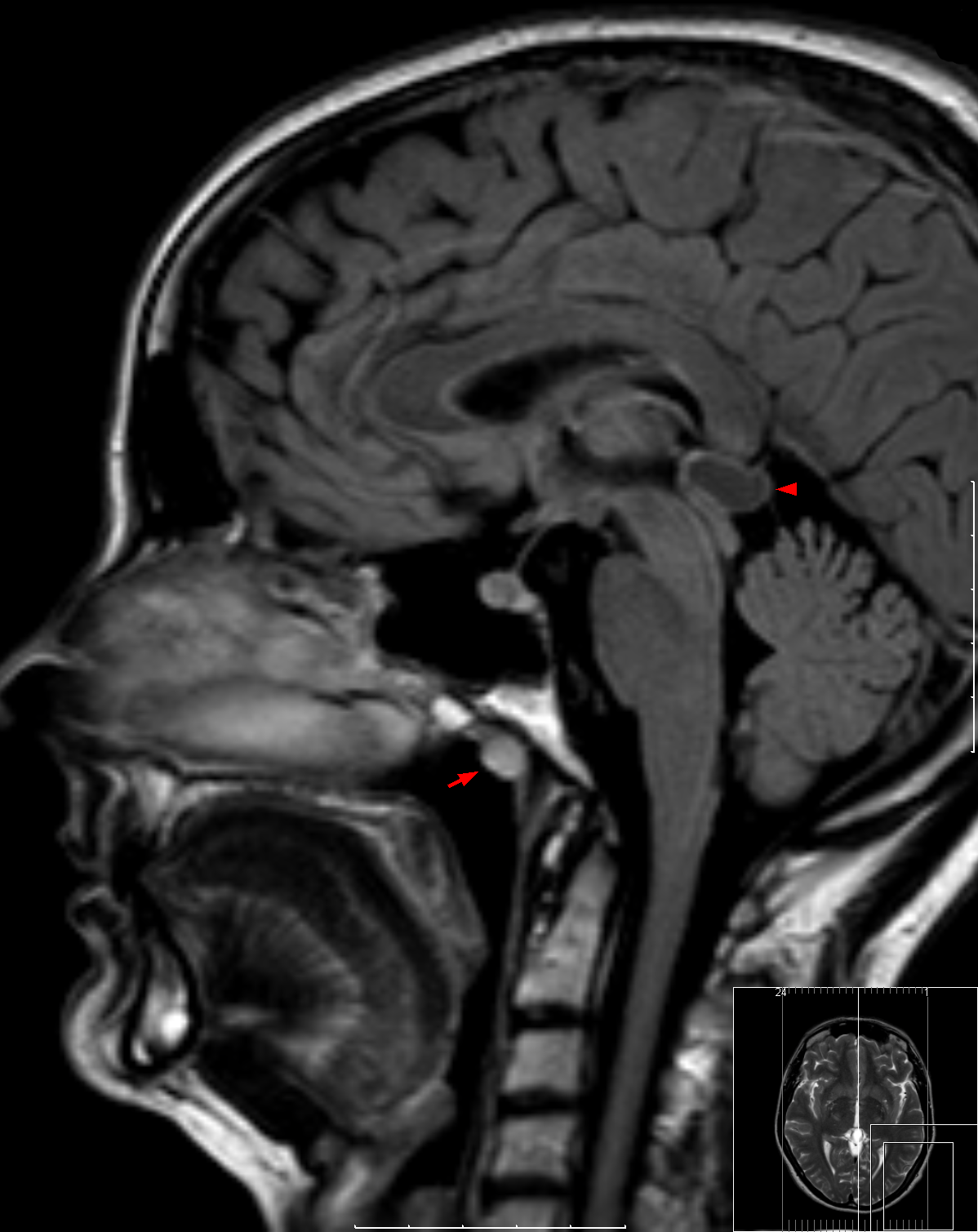
- Tornwaldt cyst imaged on sagittal MRI (FLAIR). The cyst appears hyperintense in the midline of the nasopharynx (arrow). In this case there is also a cyst of the pinealis gland (arrowhead) showing a signal intensity slightly higher than the CSF.
- Specialty: ENT surgery

A Tornwaldt cyst (also spelt as Thornwaldt or Thornwald) is a benign cyst located in the upper posterior nasopharynx. It was first described by Gustav Ludwig Tornwaldt. It can be seen on computed tomography (CT) or magnetic resonance imaging (MRI) of the head as a well-circumscribed round mass lying in the midline. In most cases, treatment is not necessary. Indications for treatment include symptomatic lesions, large lesions (>1 cm), or lesions adjacent to the eustachian tube orifice.

== See also ==
- Tornwaldt's disease
