= Nasopharyngeal angiofibroma =

Benign vascular tumor of the throat (nasopharynx)

- Other names: Juvenile nasopharyngeal angiofibroma
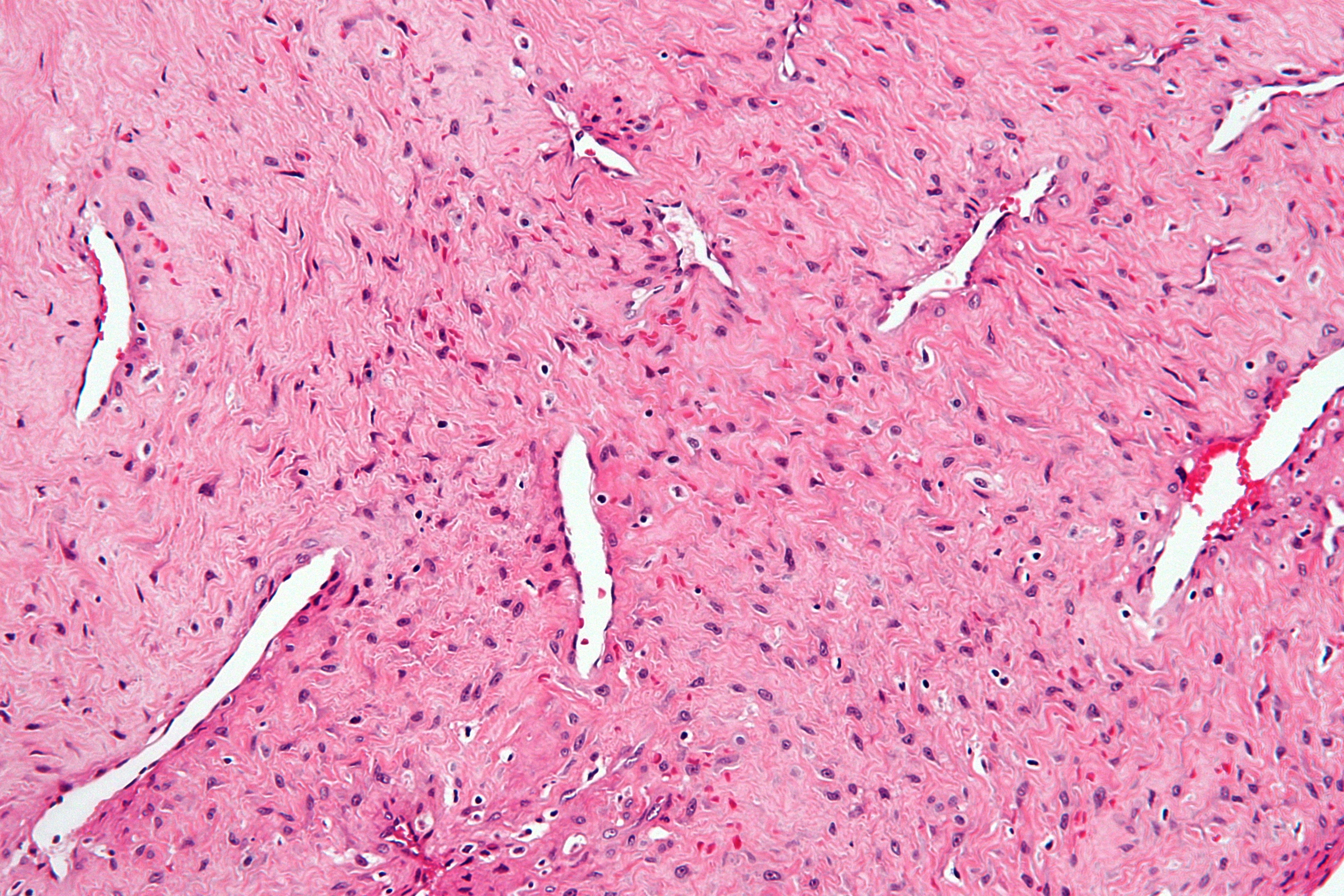
- Micrograph of a nasopharyngeal angiofibroma. H&E stain.
- Specialty: ENT surgery

Nasopharyngeal angiofibroma is an angiofibroma also known as juvenile nasal angiofibroma, fibromatous hamartoma, and angiofibromatous hamartoma of the nasal cavity. It is a benign but locally aggressive vascular tumor of the nasopharynx that arises from the superior margin of the sphenopalatine foramen and grows in the back of the nasal cavity. It most commonly affects adolescent males. Though it is a benign tumor, it is locally invasive and can invade the nose, cheek, orbit (frog face deformity), or brain.

== Features ==
The tumor is highly vascular, meaning that it has a rich blood supply. Clinically, an individual with one may present with nosebleeds, followed by nasal obstruction and then mucus discharge from the nose.

Grossly, it is a firm mass that may be yellow, dark red, or even black. Histologically, it presents with several vascular spaces of varying sizes and wall thicknesses as well as fibrous or collagenous stroma with fibroblasts. Mast cells are common. Mitotic figures are usually not present.

== Etiology ==
The cause is not well understood and remains under debate.

It is hypothesized by some that it may arise from a vascular source such as an AVM or as a remnant of the first branchial arch (an embryological feature).

Others have suggested that hormonal influences are the key component of the tumor's origins. Studies have shown the presence of androgen, progesterone, and estrogen receptors within the tumor. Some researchers have postulated that the tumor, with its strong predominance in adolescent males, is stimulated by androgen increases during puberty. This has been further supported by reports of increased tumor growth after administration of testosterone as well as reports of older women with decreased estrogen - and therefore decreased ability to counteract androgen hormone effects - presenting with the tumors. However the tumor has also been found in pregnant women. Such women have increased levels of "protective" estrogen, which would suggest androgen effects are not a significant factor.

Genetic abnormalities and HPV may also play roles in the tumor's etiology.

== Diagnosis ==
The tumors are highly vascular, and as such, angiography - an imaging technique that uses x-rays and contrast dyes - is usually used in diagnosis by visualizing blood vessel locations and structures. Also due to the lesions' vascular nature, biopsy and fine needle aspiration are typically avoided as part of a diagnostic workup as these could cause significant bleeding.

== Treatment ==
The preferred treatment is surgical resection. There are a variety of surgical techniques that can be used. Prior to surgery, an embolization procedure may be used to reduce the tumor's blood supply and thereby decrease excessive bleeding. Androgen receptor blocker medications may help reduce the tumor's size prior to surgery or if it reoccurs, but they do not eliminate the tumor.

== Prognosis ==
Prognosis for nasopharyngeal angiofibroma is favorable. Because these tumors are benign, metastasis to distal sites does not occur. However, these tumors are highly vascularized and grow rapidly. Removal is important in preventing nasal obstruction and recurrent nosebleeds. Mortality is not associated with nasopharyngeal angiofibroma.
