= Müller's maneuver =

Procedure used in medicine to diagnose some types of tinnitus

Müller's maneuver is a procedure used in medicine to diagnose some types of tinnitus, and other medical problems.

== Procedure ==
After a forced expiration, an attempt at inspiration is made with closed mouth and nose, whereby the negative pressure in the chest and lungs is made very subatmospheric; the reverse of a Valsalva maneuver.

This technique is designed to look for collapsed sections of airways such as the trachea and upper airways. In this maneuver, the patient attempts to inhale with their mouth closed and their nostrils plugged, which leads to a collapse of the airway. Introducing a flexible fiberoptic scope into the hypopharynx to obtain a view, the examiner may witness the collapse and identify weakened sections of the airway. Müller's maneuver is used to help determine the cause of sleep apnea. A positive test result means the site of upper airway obstruction is likely below the level of the soft palate, and the patient will probably not benefit from a uvulopalatopharyngoplasty alone. This maneuver is very helpful in doing MRI for sleep apnea, when sedation to patient can be avoided.

There is some evidence that the sites of obstruction with Müller's maneuver do not represent reliably the sites of obstruction during normal sleep. Other factors such as the body's position whilst conducting the manoeuvre may well affect this.

Müller's maneuver can also be used to terminate supraventricular tachycardia in an acute primary care setting.
