= Sleep and breathing =

Significant physiologic changes in breathing take place during normal sleep related to alterations in respiratory drive and musculature.

== Normal ==
=== Sleep onset ===
The set point of ventilation is different in wakefulness and sleep. pCO2 is higher and ventilation is lower in sleep. Sleep onset in normal subjects is not immediate, but oscillates between arousal, stage I and II sleep before steady NREM sleep is obtained. So falling asleep results in decreased ventilation and a higher pCO2, above the wakefulness set point. On wakefulness, this constitutes an error signal which provokes hyperventilation until the wakefulness set point is reached. When the subject falls asleep, ventilation decreases and pCO2 rises, resulting in hypoventilation or even apnea. These oscillations continue until steady state sleep is obtained. The medulla oblongata controls our respiration.

=== Steady NREM (Non-REM) sleep ===
==== Ventilation ====
Breathing is remarkably regular, both in amplitude and frequency in steady NREM sleep. Steady NREM sleep has the lowest indices of variability of all sleep stages. Minute ventilation decreases by 13% in steady stage II sleep and by 15% in steady slow wave sleep (Stage III and Stage IV sleep). Mean inspiratory flow is decreased but inspiratory duration and respiratory cycle duration are unchanged, resulting in an overall decreased tidal volume.

In a study of 19 healthy adults, the minute ventilation in NREM sleep was 7.18 ± 0.39(SEM) liters/minute compared to 7.66 ± 0.34 liters/minute when awake.

==== Rib cage and abdominal muscle contributions ====
Rib cage contribution to ventilation increases during NREM sleep, mostly by lateral movement, and is detected by an increase in EMG amplitude during breathing. Diaphragm activity is little increased or unchanged and abdominal muscle activity is slightly increased during these sleep stages.

==== Upper airway resistance ====
Airway resistance increases by about 230% during NREM sleep. Elastic and flow resistive properties of the lung do not change during NREM sleep. The increase in resistance comes primarily from the upper airway in the retro-epiglottic region. Tonic activity of the pharyngeal dilator muscles of the upper airway decreases during NREM sleep, contributing to the increased resistance, which is reflected in increased esophageal pressure swings during sleep. The other ventilatory muscles compensate for the increased resistance, and so the airflow decreases much less than the increase in resistance.

==== Arterial blood gases ====
The arterial blood gasses pCO2 increases by 3-7mmHg, pO2 drops by 3-9mmHg and SaO2 drops by 2% or less. These changes occur despite a reduced metabolic rate, reflected by a 10-20% decrease in O2 consumption, suggesting overall hypoventilation instead of decreased production/metabolism.

==== Pulmonary arterial pressure ====
Periodic oscillations of the pulmonary arterial pressure occur with respiration. Pulmonary arterial systolic and diastolic pressure and PAD increase by 4-5mm in NREM sleep

==== Effects of arousals ====
Induced transient arousal from NREM sleep cause the following: Increase EMG activity of the diaphragm 150%, increased activity of upper airway dilating muscles 250%, increased airflow and tidal volume 160% and decreased upper airway resistance.

=== Steady REM Sleep ===
==== Ventilation ====
Irregular breathing with sudden changes in both amplitude and frequency at times interrupted by central apneas lasting 10–30 seconds are noted in Rapid Eye Movement (REM) sleep. (These are physiologic changes and are different from abnormal breathing patterns noted in sleep disordered breathing). These breathing irregularities are not random, but correspond to bursts of eye movements. This breathing pattern is not controlled by the chemoreceptors, but is due to the activation of the behavioral respiratory control system by REM sleep processes. Quantitative measure of airflow is quite variable in this sleep stage and has been shown to be increased, decreased or unchanged. Tidal volume has also been shown to be increased, decreased or unchanged by quantitative measures in REM sleep. So breathing during REM sleep is somewhat discordant.

In a study of 19 healthy adults, the minute ventilation in REM sleep was 6.46 +/- 0.29(SEM) liters/minute compared to 7.66 +/- 0.34 liters/minute when awake.

==== Rib cage and abdominal muscle contributions ====
Intercostal muscle activity decreases in REM sleep and contribution of rib cage to respiration decreases during REM sleep. This is due to REM related supraspinal inhibition of alpha motoneuron drive and specific depression of fusimotor function. Diaphraghmatic activity correspondingly increases during REM sleep. Although paradoxical thoracoabdominal movements are not observed, the thoracic and abdominal displacements are not exactly in phase. This decrease in intercostal muscle activity is primarily responsible for hypoventilation that occurs in patients with borderline pulmonary function.

==== Upper airway resistance ====
Upper airway resistance is expected to be highest during REM sleep because of atonia of the pharyngeal dilator muscles and partial airway collapse. Many studies have shown this, but not all. Some have shown unchanged airway resistance during REM sleep, others have shown it to increase to NREM levels.

==== Arterial blood gases ====
Hypoxemia due to hypoventilation is noted in REM sleep but this is less well studied than NREM sleep. These changes are equal to or greater than NREM sleep

==== Pulmonary arterial pressure ====
Pulmonary arterial pressure fluctuates with respiration and rises during REM sleep.

==== Effect of arousals ====
Arousals cause return of airway resistance and airflow to near awake values. Refer arousals in NREM sleep.

== Sleep and Breathing in high altitudes ==
At a lower altitude, the link between breathing and sleep has been established. At a higher altitude, disruptions in sleep are often linked to changes in the respiratory (breathing) rhythm. Changes in altitude cause variations in sleep time (reduced to 0% up to 93%), as shown in a study that examined people at sea level and Pikes Peak (4300 meters). These subjects also experienced more frequent arousals and diminished stage 3 and stage 4 sleep. A poorer quality of sleep was indicated, but not due to less sleep time, but more frequent awakenings during the night.

== Sleep-disordered breathing (abnormal sleep and breathing or sleep-related breathing disorders) ==
A sleep apnea patient exhibiting a 32s pause in breathing and snoring.

=== Primary snoring ===
Snoring is a condition characterized by noisy breathing during sleep. Usually, any medical condition where the airway is blocked during sleeping, like obstructive sleep apnea, may give rise to snoring. Snoring, when not associated with an obstructive phenomenon is known as primary snoring. Apart from the specific condition of obstructive sleep apnea, other causes of snoring include alcohol intake prior to sleeping, stuffy nose, sinusitis, obesity, long tongue or uvula, large tonsil or adenoid, smaller lower jaw, deviated nasal septum, asthma, smoking and sleeping on one's back. Primary snoring is also known as "simple" or "benign" snoring, and is not associated with sleep apnea.

=== Obstructive sleep apnea (including hypopnea) syndrome ===
Obstructive sleep apnea is apnea either as the result of obstruction of the air passages or inadequate respiratory muscle activity.

=== Central sleep apnea syndrome ===
Sleep apnea (or sleep apnoea in British English; /æpˈniːə/) is a sleep disorder characterized by pauses in breathing or instances of shallow or infrequent breathing during sleep. Each pause in breathing, called an apnea, can last for several seconds to several minutes, and may occur 5 to 30 times or more in an hour.
