= Adenoid =

Type of tonsil

Adenoids
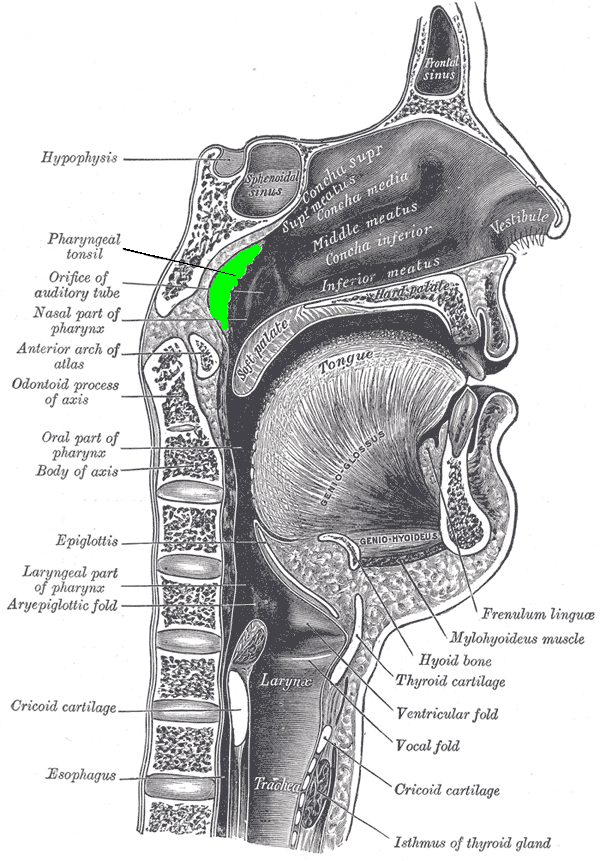
- Location of the adenoid

Details
- System: Lymphatic system

Identifiers
- Latin: tonsilla pharyngea
- MeSH: D000234
- TA98: A05.3.01.006
- TA2: 5186
- FMA: 54970

The adenoid, also known as the pharyngeal tonsil, or nasopharyngeal tonsil is the superior-most of the tonsils. It is a mass of lymphoid tissue located behind the nasal cavity, in the roof and the posterior wall of the nasopharynx, where the nose blends into the throat. In children, it normally forms a soft mound in the roof and back wall of the nasopharynx, just above and behind the uvula.

The term adenoid is also used in anatomy to represent adenoid hypertrophy, the abnormal growth of the pharyngeal tonsils.

== Structure ==
The adenoid is a mass of lymphoid tissue located behind the nasal cavity, in the roof and the posterior wall of the nasopharynx, where the nose blends into the throat. The adenoid, unlike the palatine tonsils, has pseudostratified epithelium. The adenoids are part of the so-called Waldeyer ring of lymphoid tissue, which also includes the palatine tonsils, the lingual tonsils, and the tubal tonsils.

=== Development ===
Adenoids develop from a subepithelial infiltration of lymphocytes after the 16th week of embryonic life. After birth, enlargement begins and continues until the ages of 5 to 7 years.

=== Function ===
The adenoids are a part of the immune system that recognizes and traps pathogens such as bacteria and viruses. In response, the adenoid produces T cells and B cells to combat infection, contributing to the synthesis of IgA immunoglobulins, assisting in the body's immunologic memory.

=== Microbiome ===
Normal flora found in the adenoid consists of alpha-hemolytic streptococci and enterococci, Corynebacterium species, coagulase-negative staphylococci, Neisseria species, Haemophilus species, Micrococcus species, and Stomatococcus species. Chronic inflammation of the adenoids by microbes or bacteria may lead to adenotonsillar disease (adenoiditis, recurrent tonsillitis).

== Clinical significance ==
=== Enlargement ===
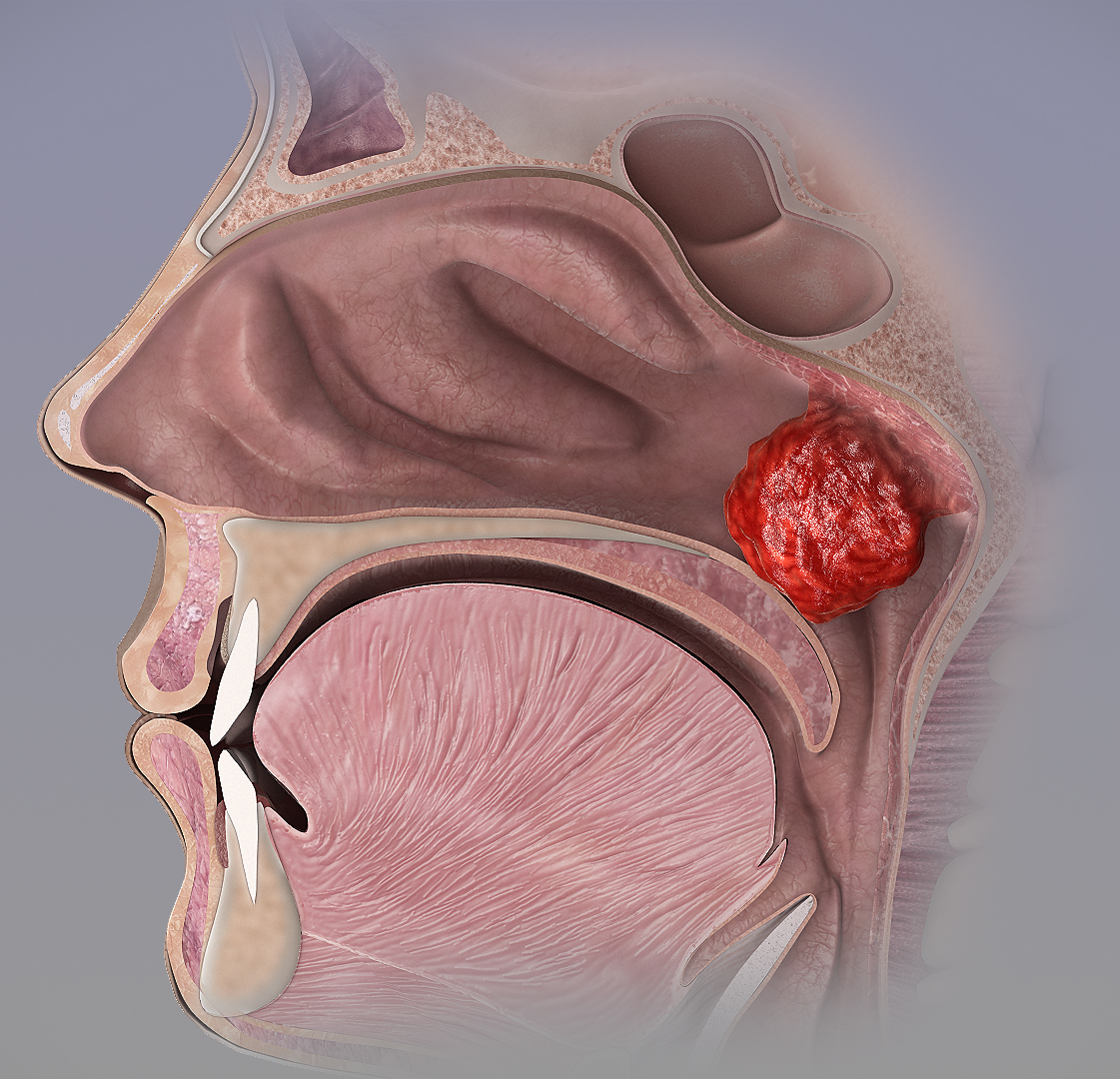
3D still showing adenoid hypertrophy

An enlarged adenoid, or adenoid hypertrophy, can become nearly the size of a ping pong ball and completely block airflow through the nasal passages. Even if the enlarged adenoid is not substantial enough to physically block the back of the nose, it can obstruct airflow enough so that breathing through the nose requires an uncomfortable amount of work, and inhalation occurs instead through an open mouth. The enlarged adenoid would also obstruct the nasal airway enough to affect the voice without stopping nasal airflow.

Symptomatic enlargement between 18 and 24 months of age is not uncommon, meaning that snoring, nasal airway obstruction, and obstructed breathing may occur during sleep. Adenoid growth typically stops between ages five and seven, and therefore adenoid hypertrophy often regresses naturally in children around ages seven to eight.

=== Adenoid facies ===
Adenoid facies is an atypical appearance of the face caused by enlargement of the adenoid, found especially in children. Features of adenoid facies include mouth breathing, an elongated face, prominent incisors, hypoplastic maxilla, short upper lip, elevated nostrils, and a high arched palate.

=== Removal ===
Surgical removal of the adenoid is through adenoidectomy. Adenoid infection may cause symptoms such as excessive mucus production. Removing the adenoid treats this symptom. Studies have shown that adenoid regrowth occurs in up to 19% of cases after removal. Carried out through the mouth under a general anaesthetic (or less commonly a topical), adenoidectomy involves the adenoid being curetted, cauterized, lasered, or otherwise ablated. The adenoid is often removed along with the palatine tonsils.

== See also ==
- Waldeyer's tonsillar ring
