= Adenoidectomy =

Surgical removal of the adenoid

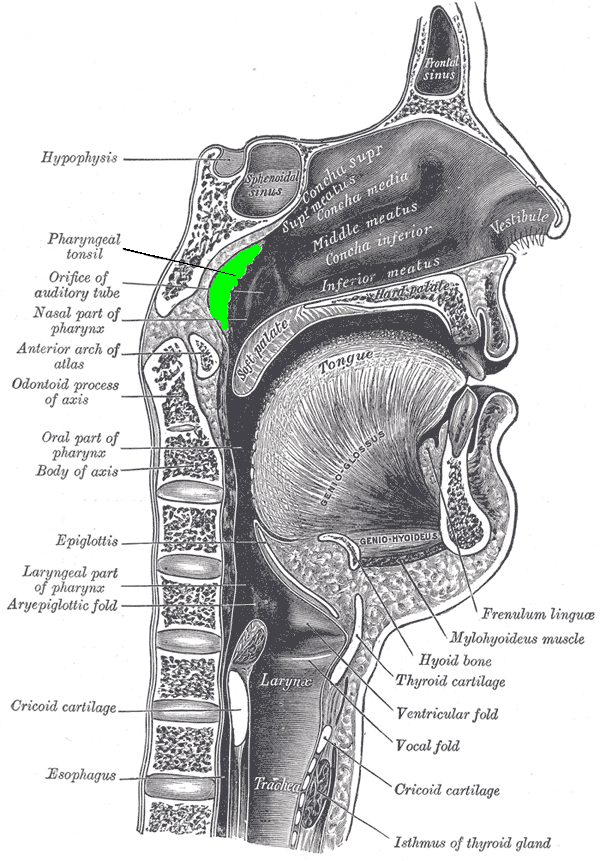
- Location of the adenoid (colored in green)
- Specialty: Otorhinolaryngology
- ICD-9-CM: 28
- MeSH: D000233
- MedlinePlus: 003011
- eMedicine: 872216

Adenoidectomy is the surgical removal of the adenoid for reasons which include impaired breathing through the nose, chronic infections, or recurrent earaches. The effectiveness of removing the adenoids in children to improve recurrent nasal symptoms and/or nasal obstruction has not been well studied. The surgery is less commonly performed in adults in whom the adenoid is much smaller and less active than it is in children. It is most often done on an outpatient basis under general anesthesia. Post-operative pain is generally minimal and reduced by icy or cold foods. The procedure is often combined with tonsillectomy (this combination is usually called an "adenotonsillectomy" or "T&A"), for which the recovery time is an estimated 10–14 days, sometimes longer, mostly dependent on age.

Adenoidectomy is not often performed under one year of age as adenoid function is part of the body's immune system, but its contribution to this decreases progressively beyond this age.

== Medical uses ==
The indications for adenoidectomy are still controversial. Widest agreement surrounds the removal of the adenoid for obstructive sleep apnea, usually combined with tonsillectomy. Even then, it has been observed that a significant percentage of the study population (18%) did not respond. There is also support for adenoidectomy in recurrent otitis media in children previously treated with tympanostomy tubes. Finally, the effectiveness of adenoidectomy in children with recurrent upper respiratory tract infections, common cold, otitis media and moderate nasal obstruction has been questioned with the outcome, in some studies, being no better than watchful waiting.

== Frequency ==
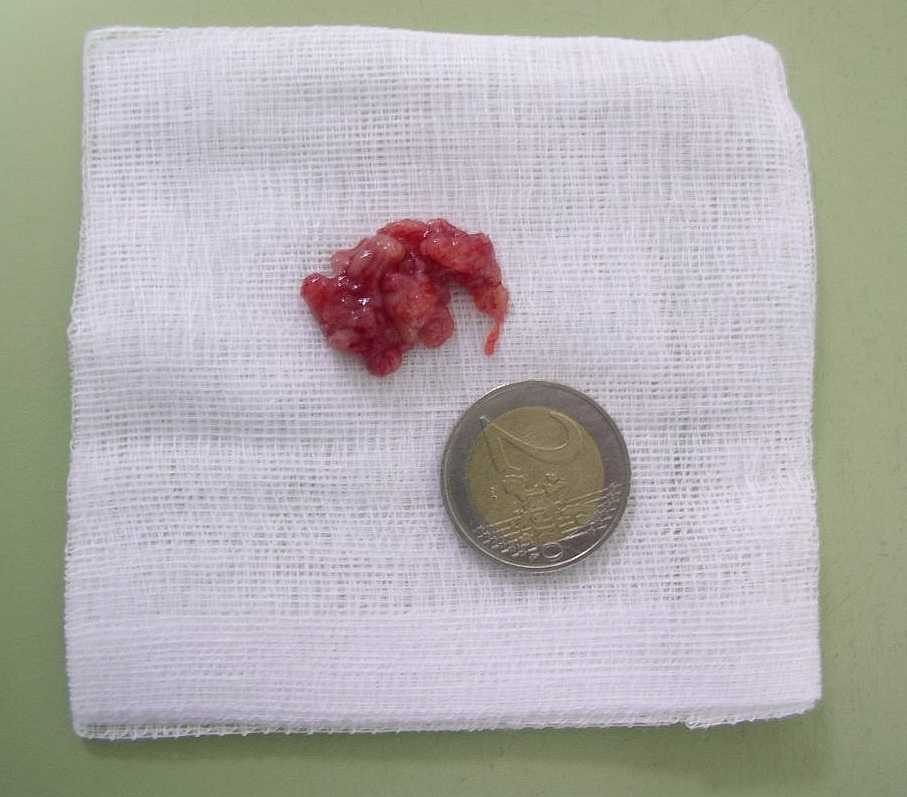
Removed adenoid

In 1971, more than one million Americans underwent tonsillectomies and/or adenoidectomies, of which 50,000 consisted of adenoidectomy alone.

By 1996, roughly a half million children underwent some surgery on their adenoid and/or tonsils in both outpatient and inpatient settings. This included approximately 60,000 tonsillectomies, 250,000 combined tonsillectomies and adenoidectomies, and 125,000 adenoidectomies. By 2006, the total number had risen to over 700,000 but when adjusted for population changes, the tonsillectomy "rate" had dropped from 0.62 per thousand children to 0.53 per thousand. A larger decline for combined tonsillectomy and adenoidectomy was noted - from 2.20 per thousand to 1.46. There was no significant change in adenoidectomy rates for chronic infectious reasons (0.25 versus 0.21 per 1000).

== History ==
Adenoidectomy was first performed using a ring forceps through the nasal cavity by William Meyer in 1867.

In the early 1900s, adenoidectomies began to be routinely combined with tonsillectomy. Initially, the procedures were performed by otolaryngologists, general surgeons, and general practitioners but over the past 30 years have been performed almost exclusively by otolaryngologists.

Then, adenoidectomies were performed as treatment of anorexia nervosa, mental retardation, and enuresis or to promote 'good health'. By current standards, these indications seem odd but may be explained by the hypothesis that children might have failed to thrive if they had chronically sore throats or severe obstructive sleep apnea (OSA). Also, children who heard poorly because of chronic otitis media might have had unrecognized speech delay mistaken for intellectual disability. Adenoidectomy might have helped to resolve ear fluid problems, speech delays, and consequent perceptions of low intelligence.

The relationship between enuresis and obstructive apnea, and the benefit of adenoidectomy by implication, is complex and controversial. On one hand, the frequency of enuresis declines as children grow older. On the other, the size of the adenoid, and again by implication, any obstruction that they might be causing, also declines with increasing age. These two factors make it difficult to distinguish the benefits of adenoidectomy from age-related spontaneous improvement. Further, most of the studies in the medical literature which appear to show benefit from adenoidectomy have been case reports or case series. Such studies are prone to unintentional bias. Finally, a recent study of six thousand children has not shown an association between enuresis and obstructive sleep in general but an increase with advancing severity of obstructive sleep apnea, observed only in girls.

A decline in the frequency of the procedure started in the 1930s as its use became controversial. Tonsillitis and adenoiditis requiring surgery became less frequent with the development of antimicrobial agents and a decline in upper respiratory infections among older school-aged children. Also, several studies had shown that adenoidectomy and tonsillectomy were ineffective for many of the indications used at that time as well as the suggestion of an increased risk of developing poliomyelitis after the procedure, later disproved. Prospective clinical trials, performed over the last 2 decades, have redefined the appropriate indications for tonsillectomy and adenoidectomy (T&A), tonsillectomy alone, and adenoidectomy alone.

== See also ==
- List of surgeries by type
