= Nasoendoscopy =

Endoscopic examination

- Purpose: exam of the nose

In speech pathology and medicine, nasoendoscopy is the endoscopic examination of the velopharynx, or the nose, often with a CCD camera or a fiber optic camera on a flexible tube passed through the nostril. It can provide information to evaluate speech and velopharyngeal function or dysfunction, as in diseases such as sinonasal carcinomas.

== Procedure ==
=== Indications ===
After removal of nasal packing following epistaxis, routine nasoendoscopy is not necessarily indicated. However, widely accepted indications for nasoendoscopy include:

- abnormal speech characteristics: hypernasal resonance, excessive nasal airflow including nasal air escape and nasal turbulence (also called nasal rustle), and absence of or weak intra-oral air pressure for oral pressure consonants;
- limited progress with speech therapy to establish oral pressure sounds;
- difficulty maintaining intra-oral air pressure and velopharyngeal closure during speech;
- patient has known or suspected abnormality of palate or velopharynx; and,
- patient is being considered for pharyngoplasty, maxillary advancement or speech prosthesis.

=== Contraindications, complications, and safety ===
No absolute contraindications exist for nasoendoscopy; and, while the procedure is relatively safe, the exact risk of the procedure depends on the skill and experience of the endoscope operator.
