= Toothbrush =

Oral hygiene tool

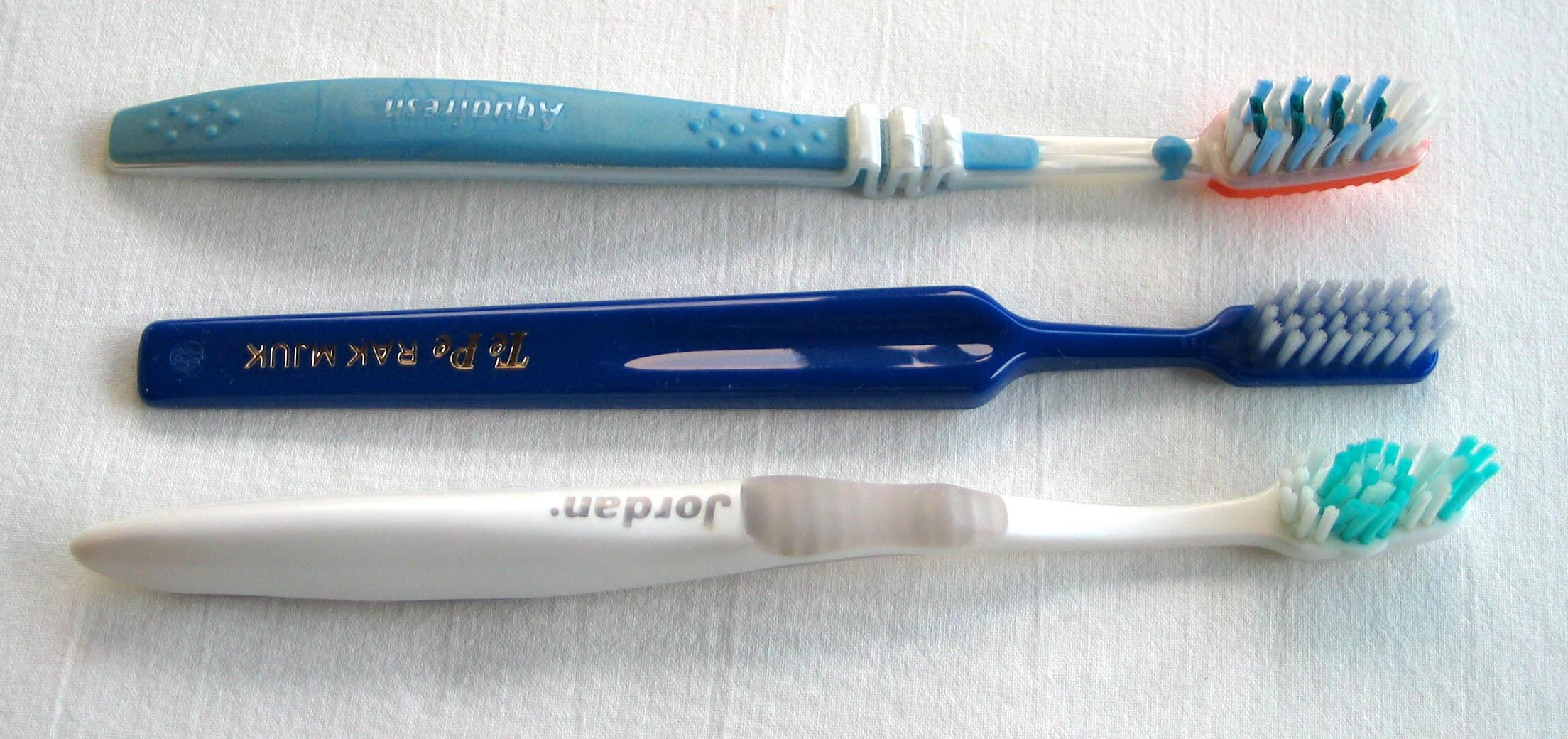
Three plastic toothbrushes

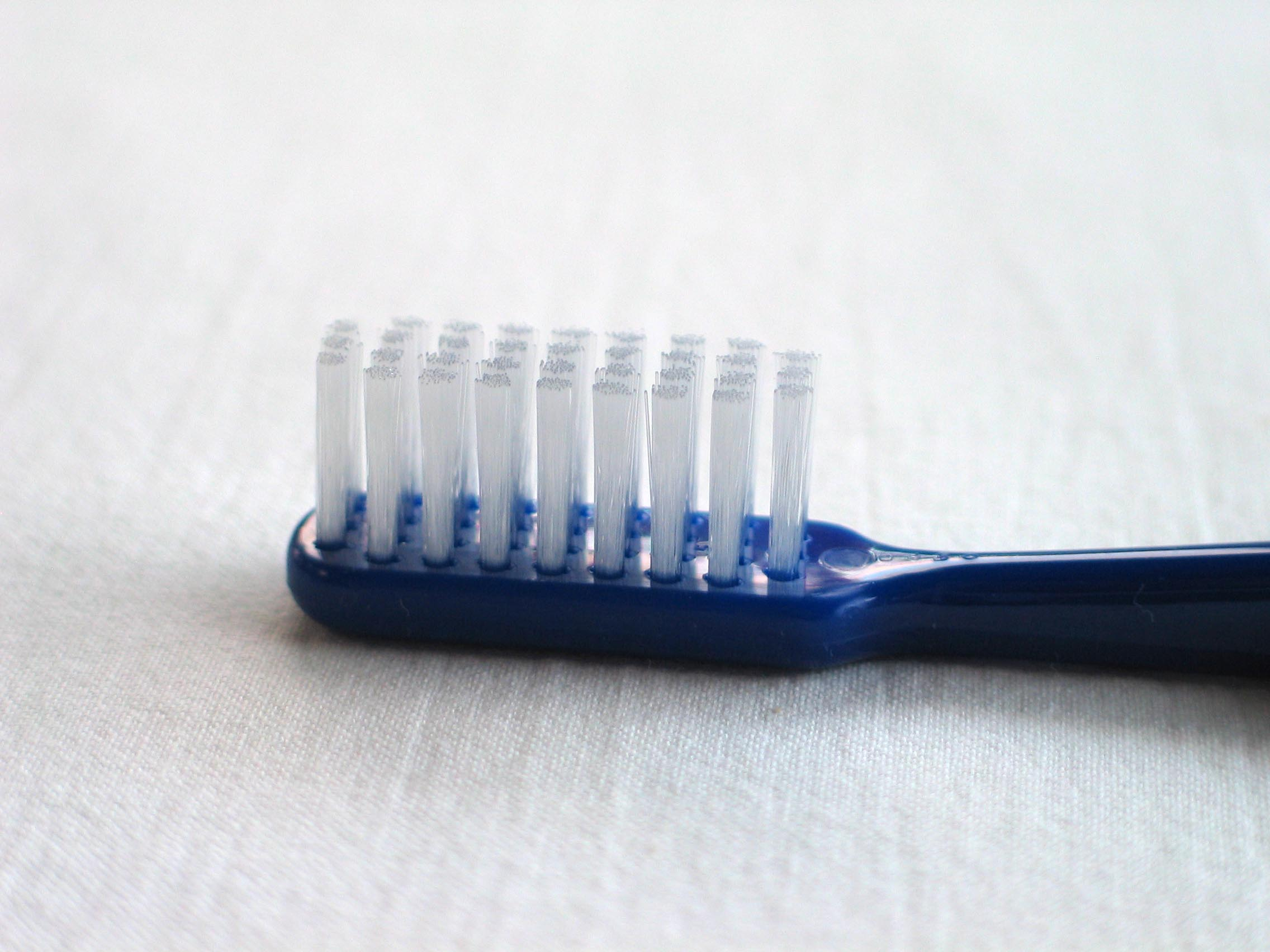
Head of a simple toothbrush

A toothbrush is a special type of brush used to clean the teeth, gums, and tongue. It consists of a head of tightly clustered bristles, onto which toothpaste is applied, mounted on a handle that facilitates cleaning hard-to-reach areas of the mouth. They should be used in conjunction with tools that clean between the teeth―where toothbrush bristles cannot reach―such as floss, tape, interdental brushes or toothpicks.

Toothbrushes are available in different bristle textures, sizes, and forms. Most dentists recommend using soft-bristled toothbrushes, as harder ones may damage tooth enamel or irritate the gums.

Since many common toothpaste ingredients are harmful if swallowed in large amounts, toothpaste should be spat out. Brushing teeth is most often done at a sink in a bathroom or kitchen, where the toothbrush is rinsed afterwards to remove any debris remaining and then dried to reduce conditions ideal for bacterial growth (and, if it is a wooden toothbrush, mold as well).

Some toothbrushes have plant-based handles, often made of bamboo. However, most are made of cheap plastic; such brushes constitute a significant source of pollution. Over 1 billion toothbrushes are discarded into landfills annually in the United States alone. Bristles are commonly made of nylon (which, while not biodegradable like plastic, may still be recycled), bamboo viscose, or boar bristles.

== History ==
=== Precursors ===
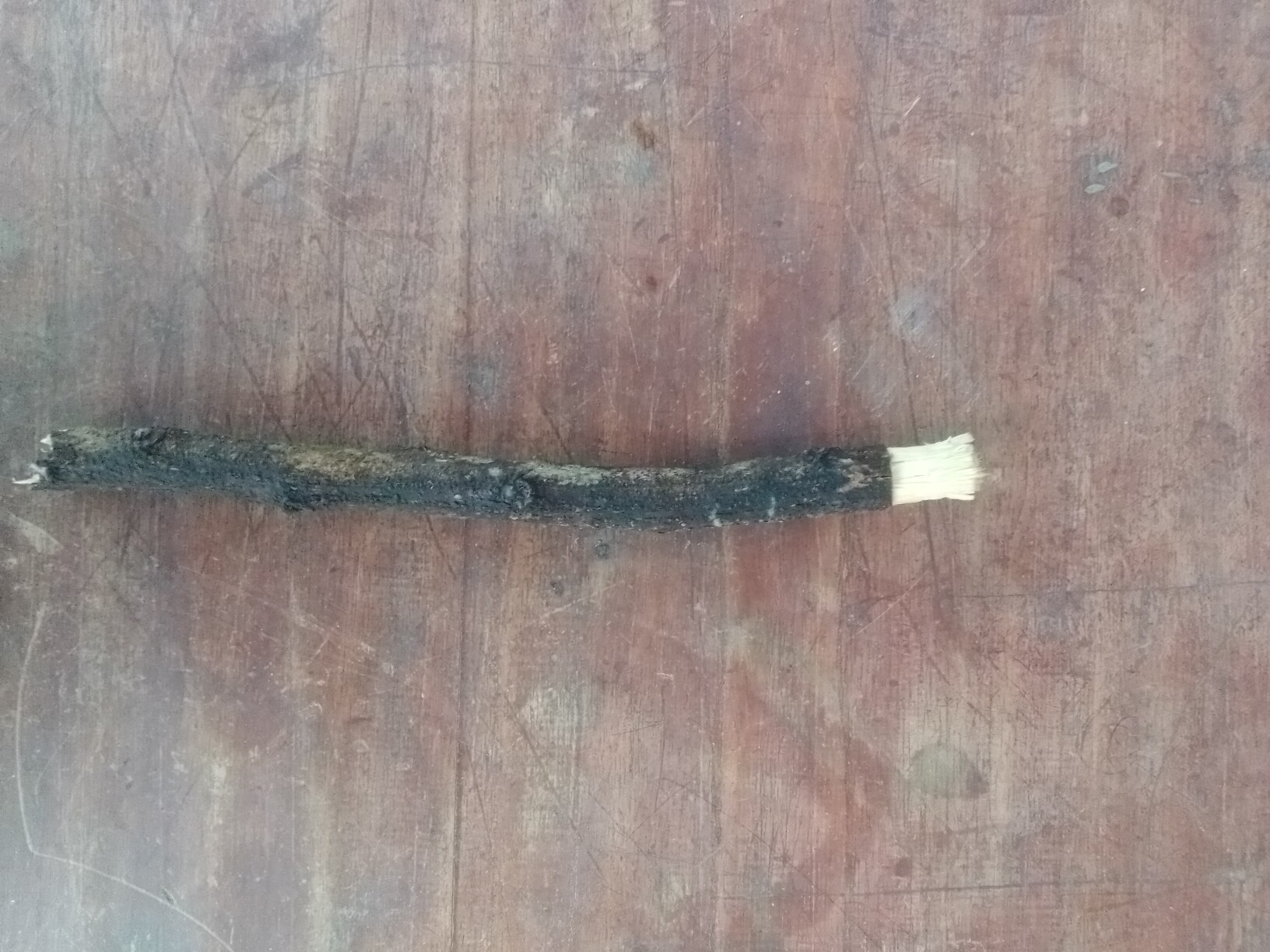
Traditional Bengali miswak, made out of neem tree

Before the invention of the toothbrush, a variety of oral hygiene measures were used. This has been verified by excavations during which tree twigs, bird feathers, animal bones and porcupine quills were recovered.

The predecessor of the toothbrush is the chew stick. Chew sticks were twigs with frayed ends used to brush the teeth while the other end was used as a toothpick. The earliest chew sticks were discovered in Sumer in southern Mesopotamia in 3500 BC, an Egyptian tomb dating from 3000 BC, and mentioned in Chinese records dating from 1600 BC.

The Indian way of using tooth wood for brushing was presented by the Chinese monk Yijing (635–713 CE) in his description of the rules for monks: "Every day in the morning, a monk must chew a piece of tooth wood to brush his teeth and scrape his tongue, and this must be done in the proper way. Only after one has washed one's hands and mouth may one make salutations. Otherwise both the saluter and the saluted are at fault. In Sanskrit, the tooth wood is known as the dantakastha—danta meaning tooth, and kastha, a piece of wood. It is twelve finger-widths in length. The shortest is not less than eight finger-widths long, resembling the little finger in size. Chew one end of the wood well for a long while and then brush the teeth with it."

The Greeks and Romans used toothpicks to clean their teeth, and toothpick-like twigs have been excavated in Qin dynasty tombs. Chew sticks remain common in Africa and the rural Southern United States. In the Islamic world, the use of the chewing stick, or miswak, is regarded as a pious action and is prescribed for use before every prayer, occurring five times a day. Miswaks have been used by Muslims since the 7th century. Twigs of the neem tree were used by ancient Indians, and continue to be used today in India, although not hugely common, under the name datun. Neem, in its full bloom, can aid in healing by keeping the tooth and gum area clean and disinfected.

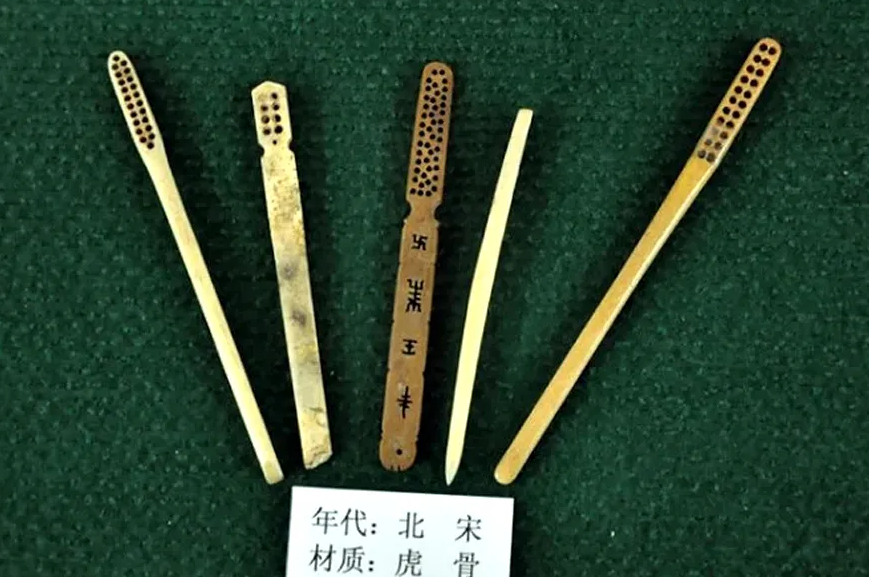
Song dynasty (960–1279) toothbrush handles made of tiger bone

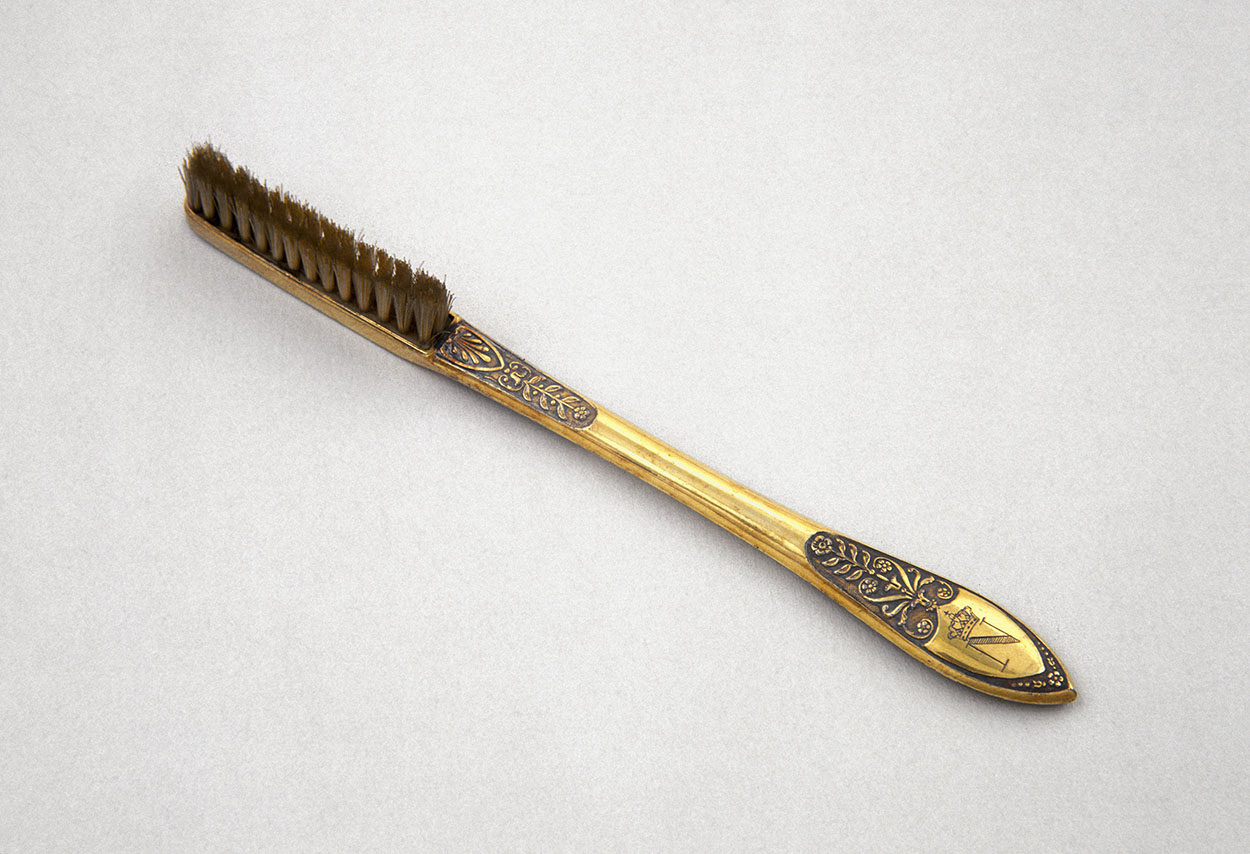
The horsehair toothbrush said to have been used by Napoleon Bonaparte (1769–1821)

=== Toothbrush ===
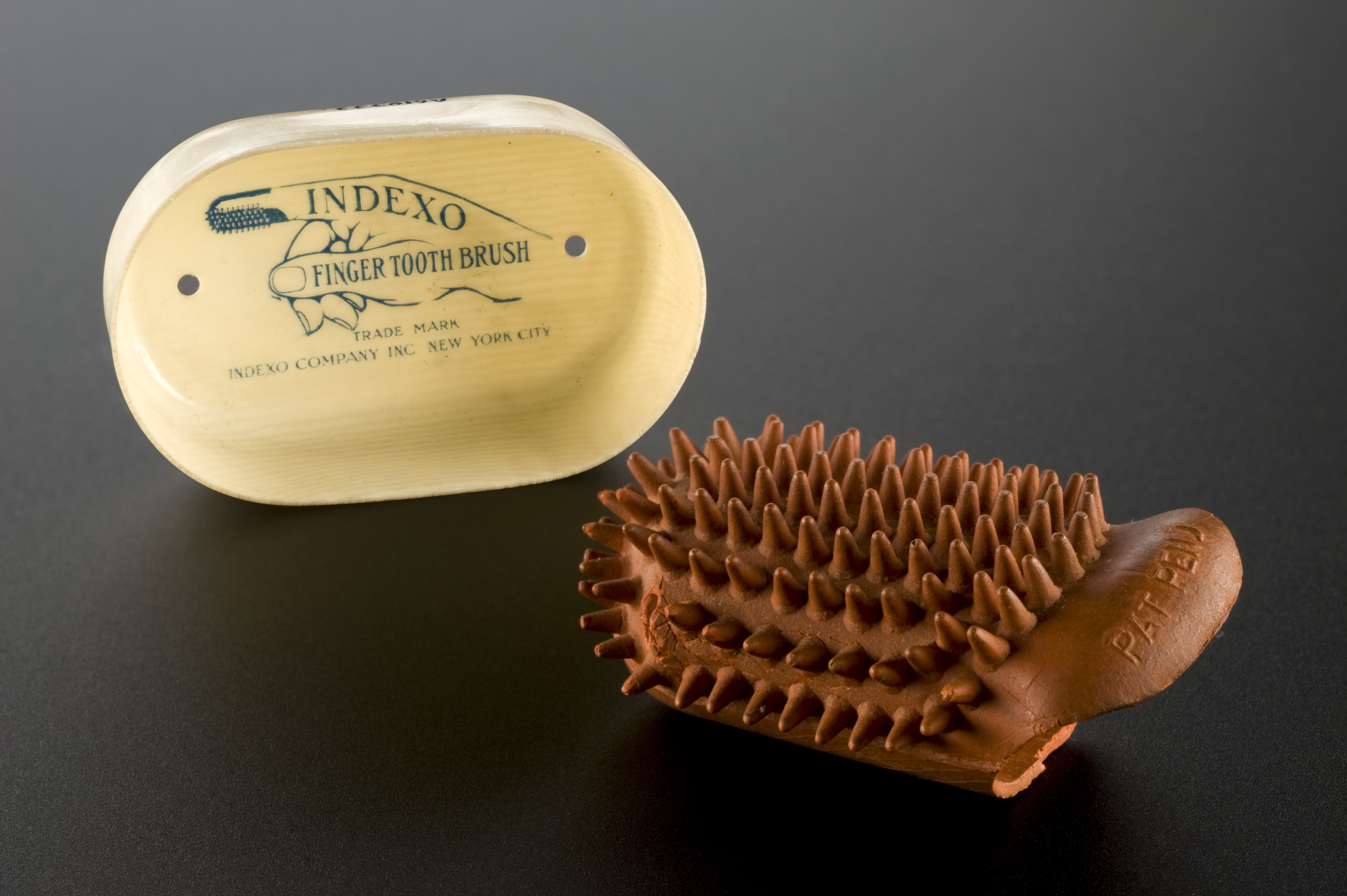
'Indexo' finger toothbrush, New York, United States, 1901–1919. It is made entirely of rubber, which has been shaped to fit over the index finger.

The first bristle toothbrush resembling the modern one was found in China. Used during the Tang dynasty (619–907), it consisted of hog bristles. The bristles were sourced from hogs living in Siberia and northern China because the colder temperatures provided firmer bristles. They were attached to a handle manufactured from bamboo or bone, forming a toothbrush. In 1223, Japanese Zen master Dōgen Kigen recorded in his Shōbōgenzō that he saw monks in China clean their teeth with brushes made of horsetail hairs attached to an oxbone handle. The bristle toothbrush spread to Europe, brought from China to Europe by travellers. It was adopted in Europe during the 17th century. The earliest identified use of the word "toothbrush" in English was in the autobiography of Anthony Wood, who wrote in 1690 that he had bought a toothbrush from J. Barret. Europeans found the hog bristle toothbrushes imported from China too firm and preferred softer bristle toothbrushes made from horsehair. Mass-produced toothbrushes made with horse or boar bristle continued to be imported to Britain from China until the mid 20th century.

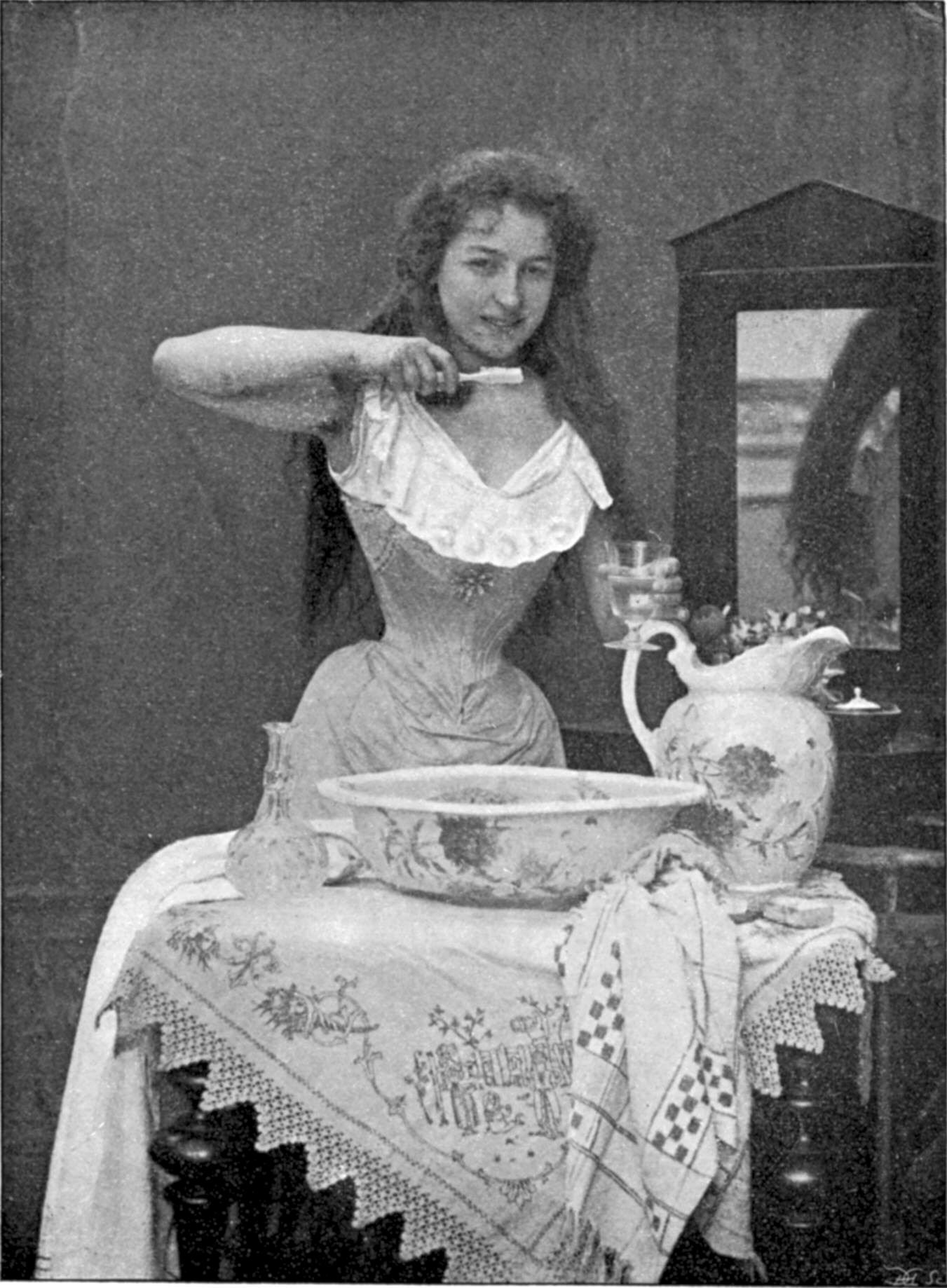
A photo from 1899 showing the use of a toothbrush

In the UK, William Addis is believed to have made the first mass-produced toothbrush in 1780. In 1770, he was jailed for causing a riot. While in prison he decided that using a rag with soot and salt on the teeth was ineffective and could be improved. After saving a small bone from a meal, he drilled small holes into the bone and tied into the bone tufts of bristles that he had obtained from one of the guards, passed the tufts of bristle through the holes in the bone and sealed the holes with glue. After his release, he became wealthy after starting a business manufacturing toothbrushes. He died in 1808, bequeathing the business to his eldest son. It remained within family ownership until 1996. Under the name Wisdom Toothbrushes, the company now manufactures 70 million toothbrushes per year in the UK. By 1840 toothbrushes were being mass-produced in Britain, France, Germany, and Japan. Pig bristles were used for cheaper toothbrushes and badger hair for the more expensive ones.

Hertford Museum in Hertford, UK, holds approximately 5000 brushes that make up part of the Addis Collection. The Addis factory on Ware Road was a major employer in the town until 1996. Since the closure of the factory, Hertford Museum has received photographs and documents relating to the archive, and collected oral histories from former employees.

The first patent for a toothbrush was granted to H.N. Wadsworth in 1857 (U.S.A. Patent No. 18,653) in the United States, but mass production in the United States did not start until 1885. The improved design had a bone handle with holes bored into it for the Siberian boar hair bristles. Unfortunately, animal bristle was not an ideal material as it retained bacteria, did not dry efficiently and the bristles often fell out. In addition to bone, handles were made of wood or ivory. In the United States, brushing teeth did not become routine until after World War II, when American soldiers had to clean their teeth daily.

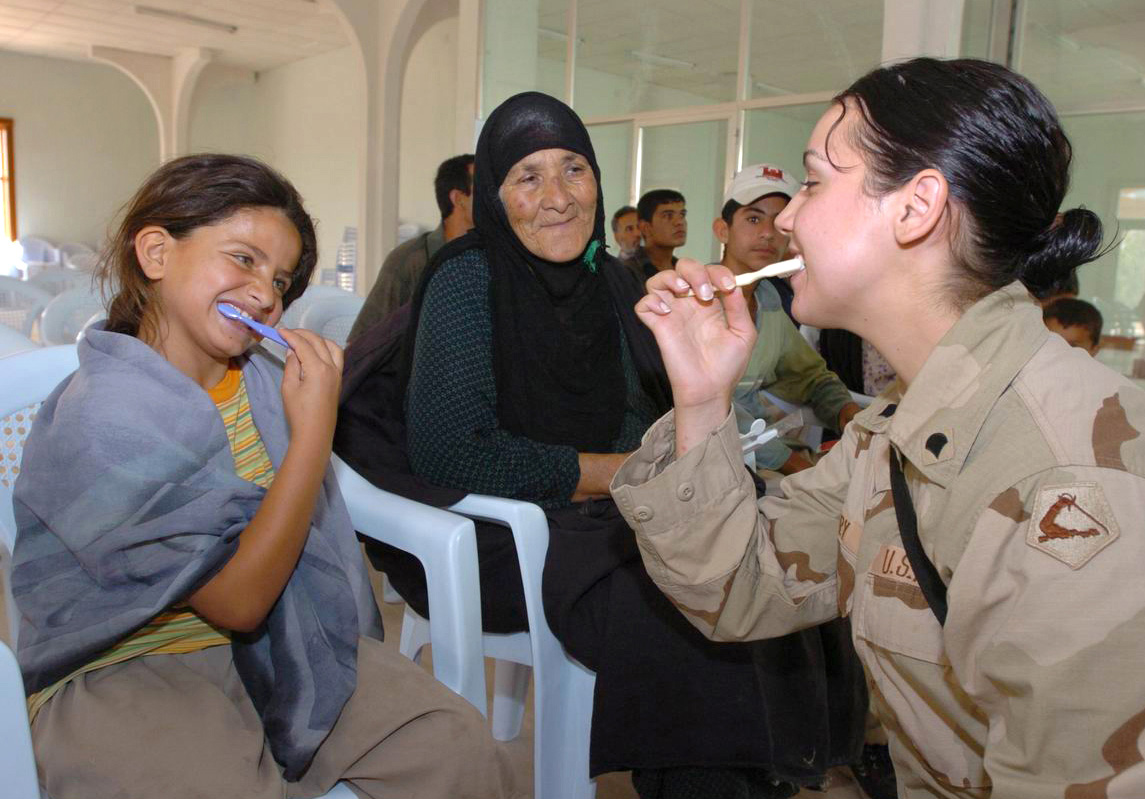
A child being shown how to use a toothbrush

During the 1900s, celluloid gradually replaced bone handles. Natural animal bristles were also replaced by synthetic fibers, usually nylon, by DuPont in 1938. The first nylon bristle toothbrush made with nylon yarn went on sale on February 24, 1938. The first electric toothbrush, the Broxodent, was invented in Switzerland in 1954. By the turn of the 21st century nylon had come to be widely used for the bristles and the handles were usually molded from thermoplastic materials.

Johnson & Johnson, a leading medical supplies firm, introduced the "Reach" toothbrush in 1977. It differed from previous toothbrushes in three ways: it had an angled head, similar to dental instruments, to reach back teeth; the bristles were concentrated more closely than usual to clean each tooth of potentially cariogenic (cavity-causing) materials; and the outer bristles were longer and softer than the inner bristles. Other manufacturers soon followed with other designs aimed at improving effectiveness. In spite of the changes with the number of tufts and the spacing, the handle form and design, the bristles were still straight and difficult to maneuver. In 1978, Dr. George C. Collis developed the Collis Curve toothbrush, which was the first toothbrush to have curved bristles. The curved bristles follow the curvature of the teeth and safely reach in between the teeth and into the sulcular areas.

In January 2003, the toothbrush was selected as the number one invention Americans could not live without, according to the Lemelson–MIT Invention Index.

== Types ==
=== Electric ===
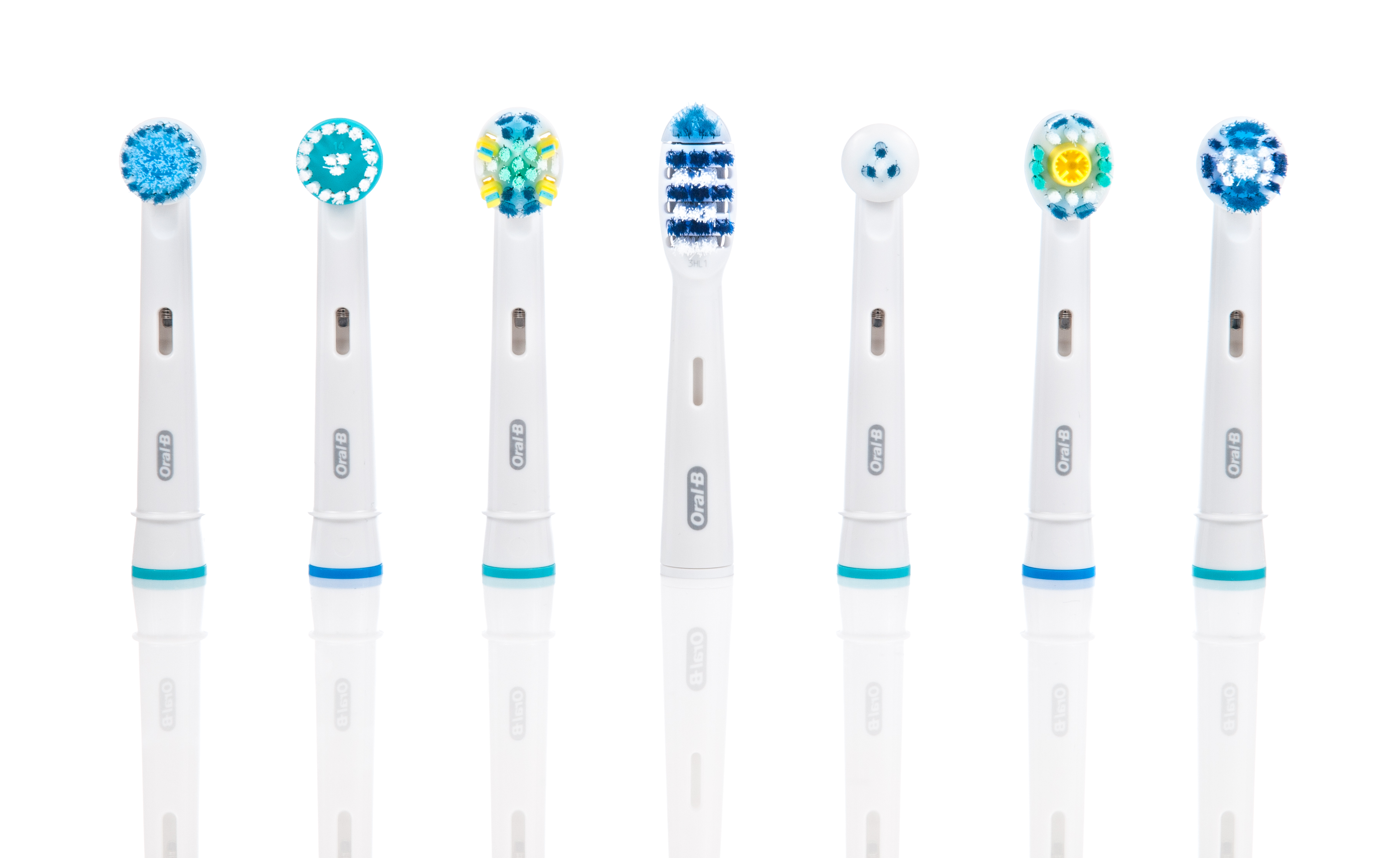
Various electric toothbrush heads

It has been discovered in most studies that compared to a manual brush, multi-directional power brush performances are equivalent to those of regular side-to-side manual brushings, possibly with a decrease in plaque and gingivitis. These brushes tend to be more costly and damaging to the environment when compared to manual toothbrushes. An additional timer and pressure sensors can encourage a more efficient cleaning process. Electric toothbrushes can be classified according to the speed of their movements as standard power toothbrushes, sonic toothbrushes, or ultrasonic toothbrushes. Any electric toothbrush is technically a powered toothbrush. If the motion of the toothbrush is sufficiently rapid to produce a hum in the audible frequency range (20 Hz to 20,000 Hz), it can be classified as a sonic toothbrush. Any electric toothbrush with movement faster than this limit can be classified as an ultrasonic toothbrush.

There are different electric toothbrush heads designed for sensitive teeth and gums, increased stain removal, or different-sized bristles for tight or gapped teeth. The hand motion with an electric toothbrush is different from a manual toothbrush. They are meant to have the bristles do the work by just placing and moving the toothbrush, so that fewer back and forth strokes are needed.

=== Interdental ===
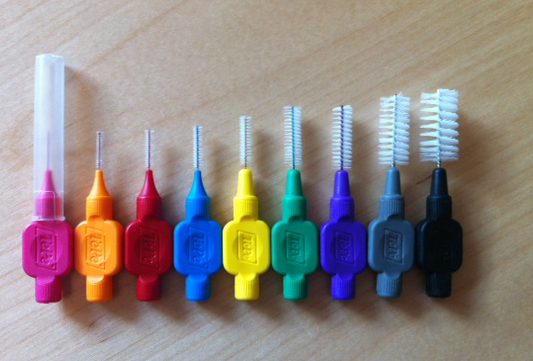
Wire-and nylon interdental brushes

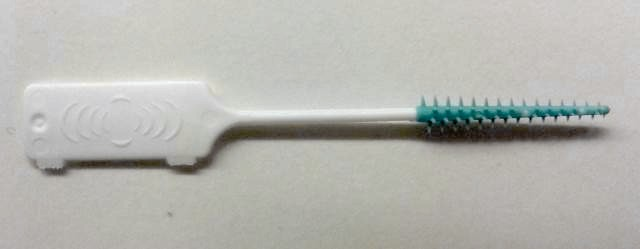
Rubbery, elastomer interdental brush

An interdental or interproximal ("proxy") brush is a small brush, typically disposable, either supplied with a reusable angled plastic handle or an integral handle, used for cleaning between teeth and between the wires of dental braces and the teeth.

The use of interdental brushes in conjunction with tooth brushing has been shown to reduce both the amount of plaque and the incidence of gingivitis when compared to tooth brushing alone. Although there is some evidence that after tooth brushing with a conventional tooth brush, interdental brushes remove more plaque than dental floss, a systematic review reported insufficient evidence to determine such an association.

The size of interdental brushes is standardized in ISO 16409. The brush size, which is a number between 0 (small space between teeth) and 8 (large space), indicates the passage hole diameter. This corresponds to the space between two teeth that is just sufficient for the brush to go through without bending the wire. The color of the brushes differs between producers. The same is the case with respect to the wire diameter.

Brush size according to ISO 16409
Brush size	0	1	2	3	4	5	6	7	8
Passage hole diameter in mm	≤ 0.6	0.7–0.8	0.9–1.0	1.1–1.2	1.3–1.5	1.6–1.8	1.9–2.3	2.4–2.8	≥ 2.8

=== End-tuft brush ===
The small round brush head comprises seven tufts of tightly packed soft nylon bristles, trimmed so the bristles in the center can reach deeper into small spaces. The brush handle is ergonomically designed for a firm grip, giving the control and precision necessary to clean where most other cleaning aids cannot reach. These areas include the posterior of the wisdom teeth (third molars), orthodontic structures (braces), crowded teeth, and tooth surfaces that are next to missing teeth. It can also be used to clean areas around implants, bridges, dentures and other oral appliances.

=== Chewable ===
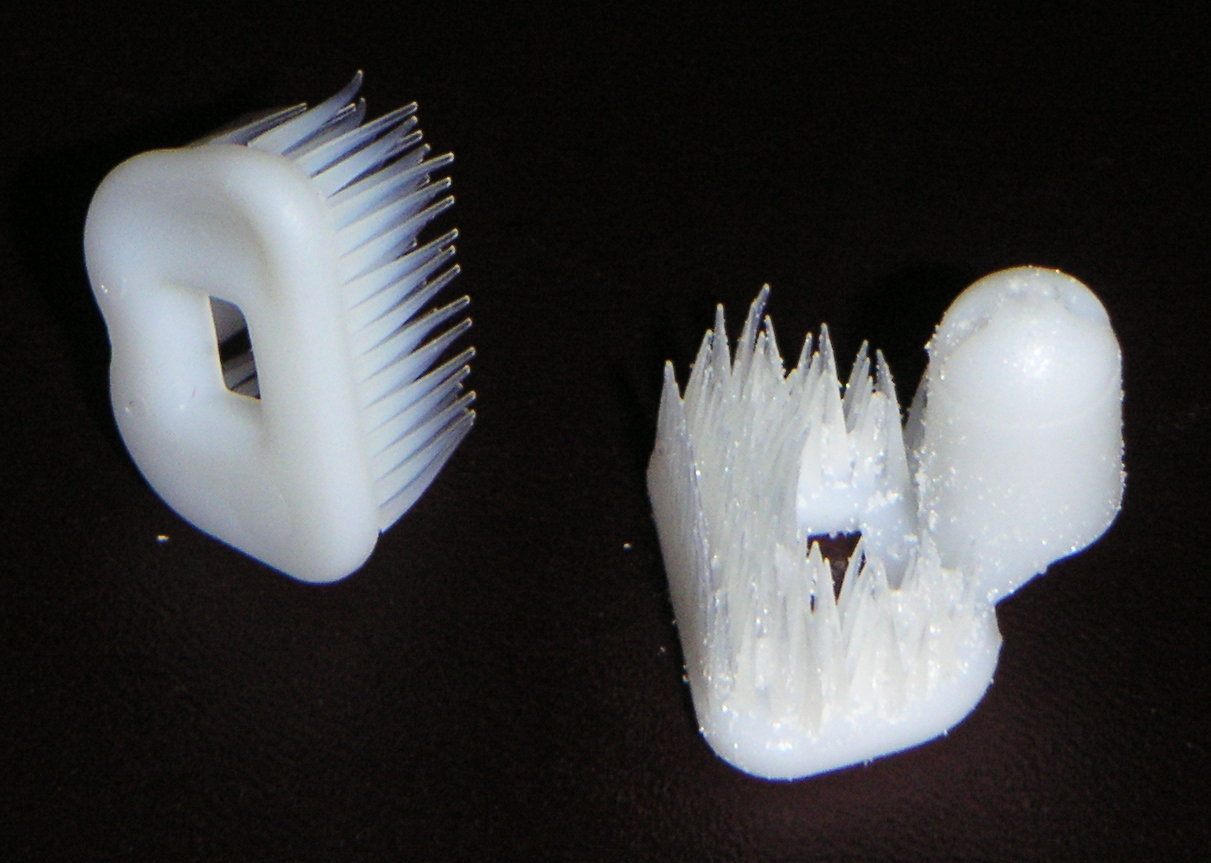
Chewable toothbrushes

A chewable toothbrush is a miniature plastic moulded toothbrush which can be placed inside the mouth. While not commonly used, they are useful to travelers and are sometimes available from bathroom vending machines. They are available in different flavors such as mint or bubblegum and should be disposed of after use. Other types of disposable toothbrushes include those that contain a small breakable plastic ball of toothpaste on the bristles, which can be used without water.

=== Musical ===
A musical toothbrush is a type of manual or powered toothbrush designed to make tooth brushing habit more interesting. It is more commonly introduced to children to gain their attention and positively influence their tooth-brushing behavior. The music starts when the child starts brushing, plays continuously during the brushing, and ends when the child stops brushing.

== Tooth brushing ==
=== Hygiene and care ===
It is not recommended to share toothbrushes with others, since besides general hygienic concerns, there is a risk of transmitting diseases that are typically transmittable by blood, such as Hepatitis C.

It is advisable to rinse the toothbrush with water, shake it off and let dry after use.

Studies have shown that brushing to remove dental plaque more often than every 48 hours is enough to maintain gum and tooth health. Tooth brushing can remove plaque up to one millimeter below the gum line. Each person has a habitual brushing method, so more frequent brushing does not cover additional parts of the teeth or mouth. Most dentists recommend patients brush twice a day in the hope that frequent brushing will clean more areas of the mouth. Tooth brushing is the most common preventive healthcare activity, but tooth and gum disease remain high, since lay people clean at most 40% of their tooth margins at the gum line. Studies show that even when asked to brush their best, they do not know how to clean effectively.

=== Risks and best practices ===
Teeth can be damaged by several factors, including poor or wrong oral hygiene. Especially for sensitive teeth, damage to dentin and gums can be prevented by several measures, including correct brushing technique.

It is beneficial when using a straight bristled brush not to scrub horizontally over the necks of teeth, not to press the brush too hard against the teeth, to choose a toothpaste that is not too abrasive, and to wait at least 30 minutes after consumption of acidic food or drinks before brushing. Harder toothbrushes reduce plaque more efficiently but are more stressful to the teeth and gums; using a medium to soft brush for a longer cleaning time was rated to be the best compromise between cleaning results and gum and tooth health.

A study by University College London found that advice on brushing technique and frequency given by 10 national dental associations, toothpaste and toothbrush companies, and in dental textbooks was inconsistent.

== See also ==
- Dental floss
- Mouthwash
- Toothbrush moustache
