= Reach (brand) =

American brand of oral hygiene products

- Product type: Oral hygiene
- Current owner: Johnson & Johnson, Perrigo (toothbrushes for US, Canada, the Caribbean), LG Household & Health Care (Asia Pacific)
- Country: United States
- Introduced: 1976; 50 years ago
- Markets: Worldwide
- Previous owners: DuPont
- Website: reachtoothbrush.com; www.reachfloss.com

Reach is an American brand of oral hygiene products, including toothbrushes, dental floss, and mouthwash. The brand originated from Reach toothbrushes developed by DuPont in 1976.

== History ==
=== 1970s ===
1976 – DuPont enters toothbrush market after four years of research conducted by "bio-dental team" from Tufts University, headed by Percy H. Hill Jr., consultant to Applied Ergonomics company. Reach Toothbrush was the first ergonomically designed toothbrush, that proved significantly better in clinical trials and spawned a whole new field of "toothbrush design".

1976 article at Chicago Tribune highlights the following unique selling propositions of the new toothbrush: "an angled-shaped four-sided handle (for comfortable gripping) with an extended neck (that makes hard-to-reach areas more accessible), and a compact head topped with two-leveled bristles".

DuPont started new toothbrush promotion in April 1976 first in Green Bay, Wisconsin, then moved to Chicago, with advertising in newspapers and on TV.

1977 – Johnson & Johnson acquires Reach brand from DuPont, outmaneuvering Procter & Gamble.

1978 – Johnson & Johnson introduced the brand nationally, backing the launch with "the first million-dollar ad campaign ever produced for a toothbrush".

=== 1980s ===
1985 – Reach toothbrush gained recognition from American Dental Association.

1986 – Mr. Reach character with the famous flip-top head, was born in Australia. Developed by animator Phil Meatchem this mascot found its way to many world markets, including Japan and the U.S.

At the end of 80's Reach occupied 28% of the US market, successfully competing against market leader Oral-B (35% of the market). However, by 1991 its market share dropped to 20%.

=== 1990s ===
1993 – Reach introduced first ever child toothbrush named "Wondergrip", designed by "Smart Design" (NY) studio.

1996 – J&J doubled its advertising budgets vs. previous year to more than $20 million – in a move aimed to recover market share that declined to 15.5%.

=== 2000s ===
2006 – Fuel Industries developed a globe-trotting animated advergame "Mr. Reach: In the Mouth of Mystery" for Johnson & Johnson Canada, featuring various Reach dental products and Mr. Reach character.

=== 2010s ===
2010 – Total Care Floss Clean toothbrush designed by Fuseproject won IDEA 2010 award. Also in 2010 Reach started "Reach by design" collaboration with interior designers Celerie Kemble and Tom Delavan as well as celebrity fashion stylist Brad Goreski.

2011 – Reach Total Care Plus Whitening advertising came under criticism from the National Advertising Division, that suggested J&J to change claims "Ordinary toothbrushes clean teeth. Reach whitens them". As an outcome NAD determined that J&J could support the claim that "[o]rdinary toothbrushes clean teeth. Reach whitens them", but suggested to modify other claims to ensure that consumers are aware that stain removal is accomplished extrinsically, through the stain-removing abrasive action of the bristles, not intrinsically through bleaching. Also in 2011 Reach continued collaboration with design celebrities, inviting Flipping Out star Jeff Lewis and Shoshanna Gruss to join "Reach by Design" project.

2012 – In December 2012, Johnson & Johnson sold rights to market Reach toothbrushes in the United States, its territories, the Caribbean and Canada to Dr. Fresh LLC, a portfolio company of Moelis Capital Partners, for an undisclosed sum. The acquisition did not include Reach floss or other interdental products.

2015 – Dr. Fresh re-introduced Mr. Reach in its advertising for "Reach Complete Care 8-in-1 Rinse". At the same year Johnson & Johnson discontinued Reach brand name and rebranded Reach floss into Listerine floss, notifying consumers about this on official website in June 2015.

2016 - LG Household & Health Care announced on November 1, 2016, that it agreed to acquire the Asia Pacific business of Reach brand from Johnson & Johnson.

2017 - High Ridge Brands acquired Dr. Fresh LLC.

2020 - Perrigo acquires oral care assets of High Ridge Brands including Reach.
