= Electric toothbrush =

Oral hygiene instrument

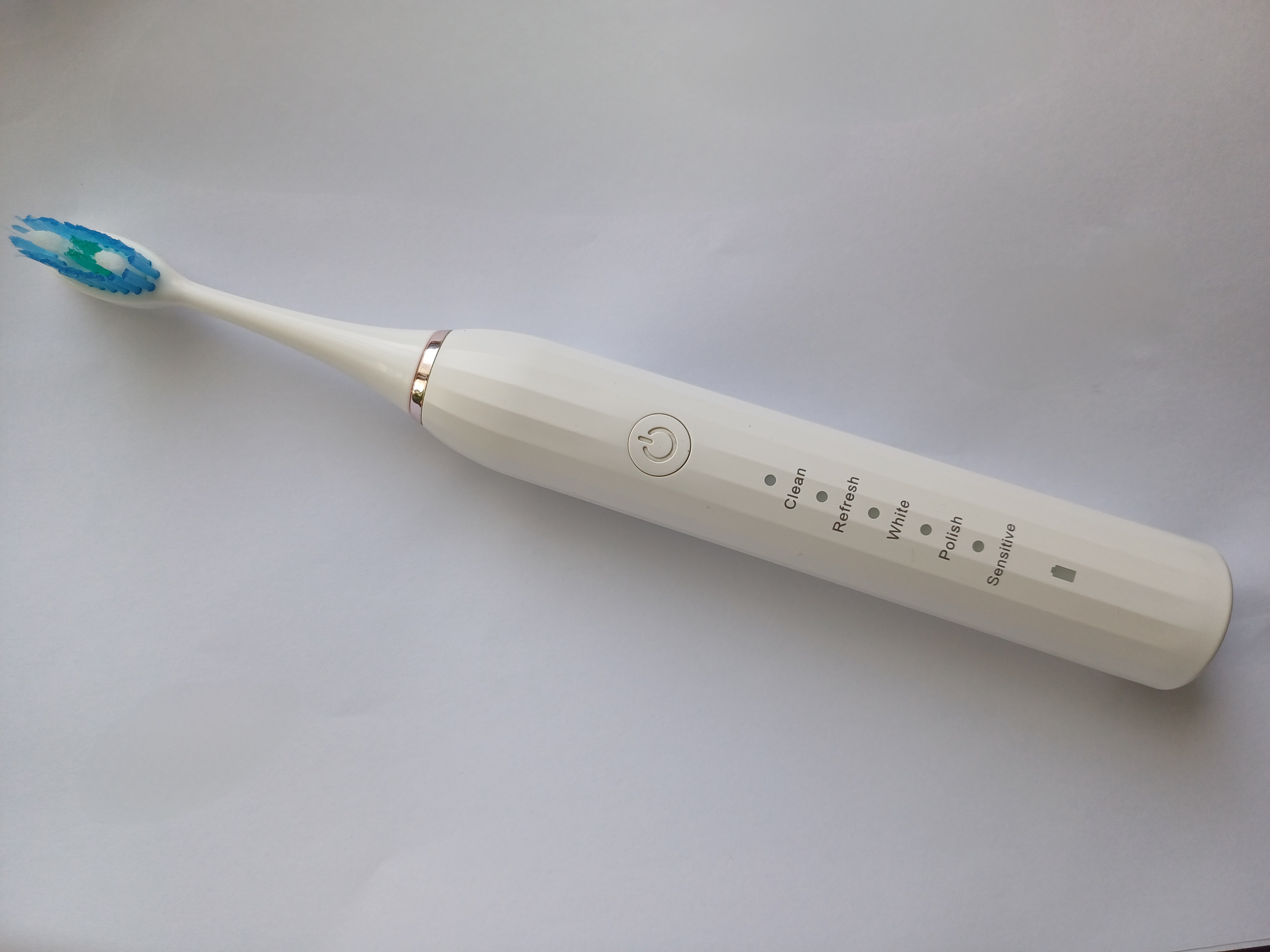
- A modern rechargeable electric toothbrush.
- Type: Personal care appliance
- Inventor: Philippe-Guy Woog
- First produced: 1954 (as the Broxodent)
- Technology: Vibrating; Rotating-oscillating; Sonic / Ultrasonic
- Power source: Rechargeable battery (Inductive charging)
- Related items: Toothbrush, Dental floss

An electric toothbrush is a toothbrush which automatically creates rapid bristle movements using oscillation motions to imitate hand brushing.

Electric toothbrushes can be classified according to the frequency of their movements as power, sonic, or ultrasonic toothbrushes, depending on whether they make movements below, in, or above the audible range, respectively.

An electric motor is used to produce motions at sonic speeds or below. A piezoelectric crystal is used for ultrasonic motions in ultrasonic toothbrushes. Later model electric toothbrushes are typically using an alternating current (AC) power cord to deliver power to a charging base that charges a direct current (DC) rechargeable battery using inductive charging technology, or it's a standalone unit powered by insertable standard size batteries like AA or AAA.

Many later models incorporate features like timers, pressure sensors with multiple cleaning modes, WiFi and Bluetooth.

== History ==
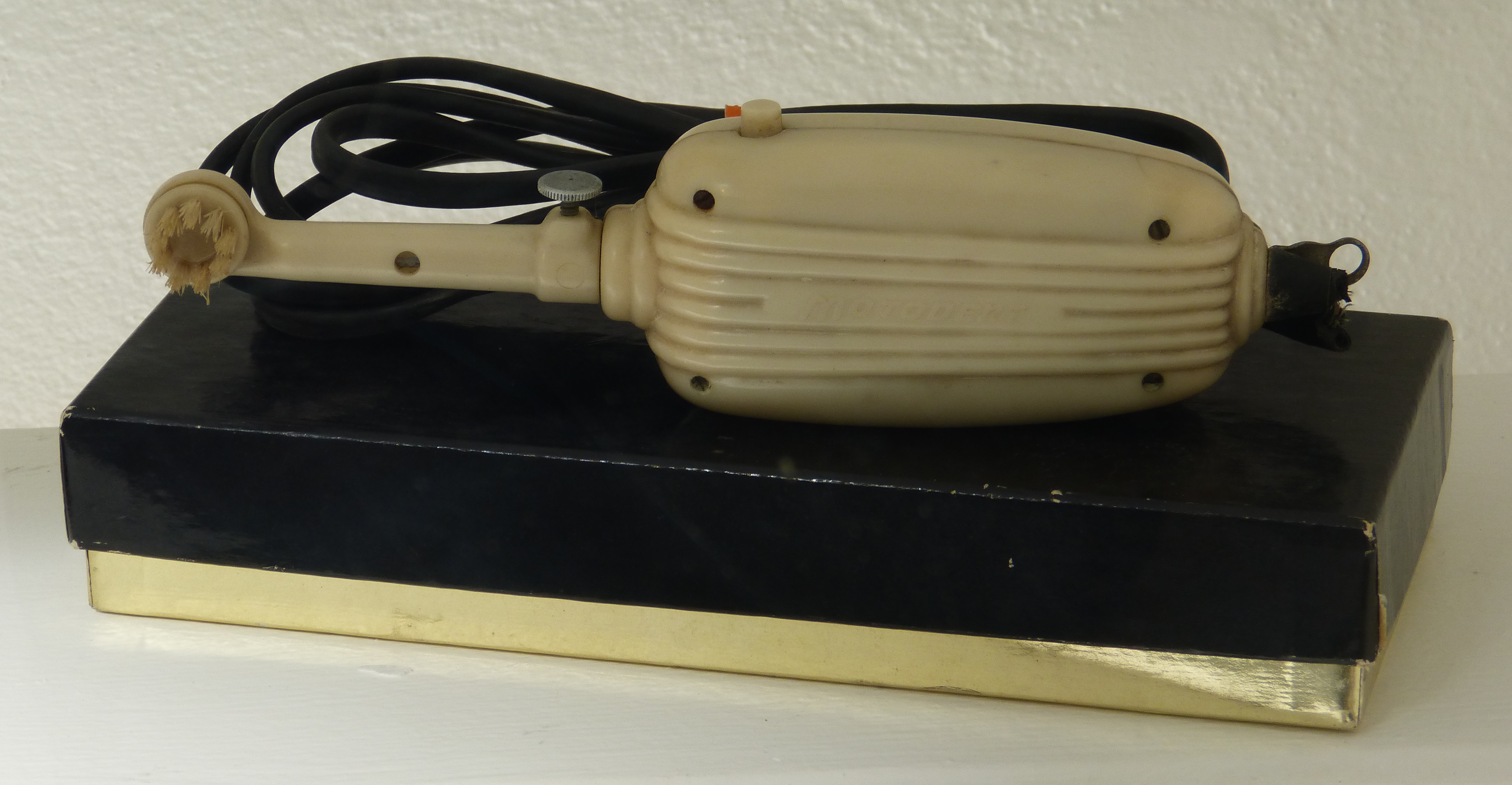
A Motodent electric toothbrush. A patent for this toothbrush was filed in 1937.

The earliest example of an electric toothbrush was produced by Tomlinson Moseley. Sold as the Motodent, a patent was filed by his company, Motodent Inc. on December 13, 1937. In Switzerland in 1954, Dr. Philippe-Guy Woog invented the Broxodent. Woog's electric toothbrushes were originally manufactured in Switzerland (later in France) for Broxo S.A. The device plugged into a standard wall outlet and ran on line voltage. Electric toothbrushes were initially created for patients with limited motor skills and for orthodontic patients (such as those with braces).

The General Electric automatic toothbrush was introduced in the early 1960s. It was cordless and powered by rechargeable NiCad batteries.The NiCad batteries of this period suffered from the memory effect. Due to prolonged charging, which can damage the battery, the maximum service life of the GE automatic toothbrush battery is shortened. Additionally, early NiCad batteries tended to have a short lifespan. As the batteries were sealed inside the device, the whole unit had to be discarded when the batteries failed.

The use of an AC line voltage appliance in a bathroom environment was problematic. By the early 1990s, the Underwriter Laboratories (UL) and Canadian Standards Association (CSA) no longer certified line-voltage appliances for bathroom use. Newer appliances had to use a step-down transformer to operate at low voltage (typically 12, 16, or 24 volts). Wiring standards in many countries require that outlets in bathroom areas must be protected by an RCD/GFCI device (e.g., required in the US since the 1970s on bathroom outlets in new construction).

By the 1990s, there were problems with the safety certification of Broxo's original design. Newer, battery-operated toothbrushes were invented by Tomlinson I Moseley and patented by Motodent in 1940.

The first ultrasonic toothbrush, first called the Ultima and later the Ultrasonex, was patented in the US in 1992, the same year the FDA gave it approval for daily home use. Initially, the Ultima worked only on ultrasound, but a few years later, a motor was added to give the Ultrasonex brush additional sonic vibration. Today, several ultrasonic toothbrushes simultaneously provide both ultrasound and sonic vibration.

== Types ==
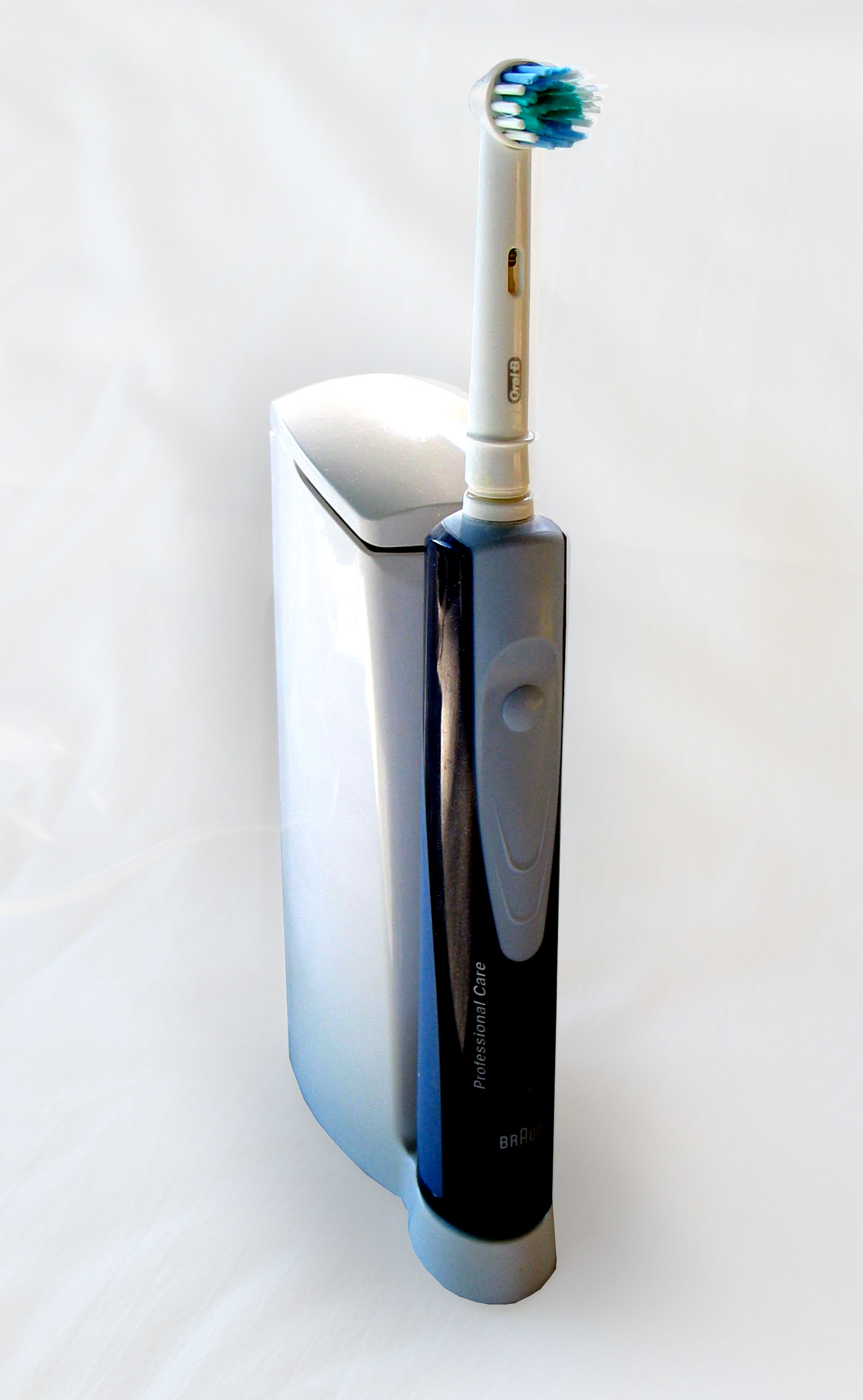
Electric toothbrush

Electric toothbrushes can be classified according to the speed of their movements as standard power toothbrushes, sonic toothbrushes, or ultrasonic toothbrushes. If the motion of the toothbrush is sufficiently rapid to produce a hum in the audible frequency of human range (20 Hz to 20,000 Hz), it is classified as a sonic toothbrush. Any electric toothbrush with movement faster than this limit is an ultrasonic toothbrush. Some ultrasonic toothbrushes have both sonic and ultrasonic movements.

Electric toothbrushes can also be classified according to the type of oscillation movement, whether the brush head moves side-to-side, rotates in one direction, alternates rotations back and forth in opposite directions, or has two segments that rotate or move in opposite directions.

For some vibrating toothbrush designs, a brushing technique similar to that used with a manual toothbrush is recommended, whereas with brushes that have a spinning head, the recommended cleaning technique is to simply move the brush slowly from tooth to tooth.

=== Oscillating rotating ===
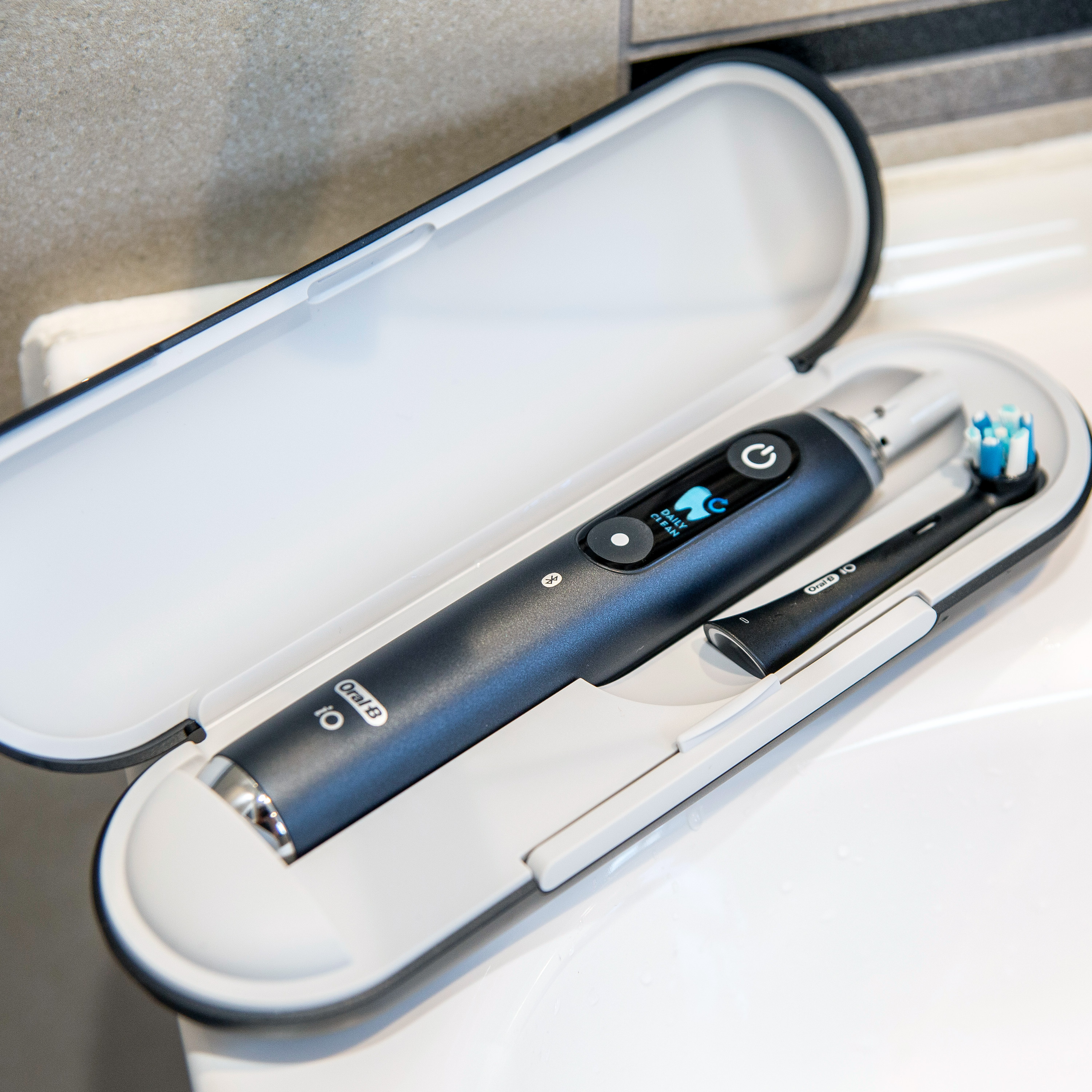
Oral-B iO toothbrush

The oscillating rotating toothbrush is a type of electric toothbrush which rapidly alternates its direction of rotation. This type of toothbrush is not shaped like a conventional manual toothbrush. Instead, it is made of a small circular brush head that spins in both directions to remove plaque. This design enables the bristles to reach further into the interdental spaces between the teeth to remove plaque. Some versions of the oscillating rotating toothbrush also involve a pulsating motion, designed to aid in plaque removal.

Oscillating rotating toothbrushes, compared to manual toothbrushes, are safe for both the hard and soft tissues of the oral cavity.

=== Sonic ===
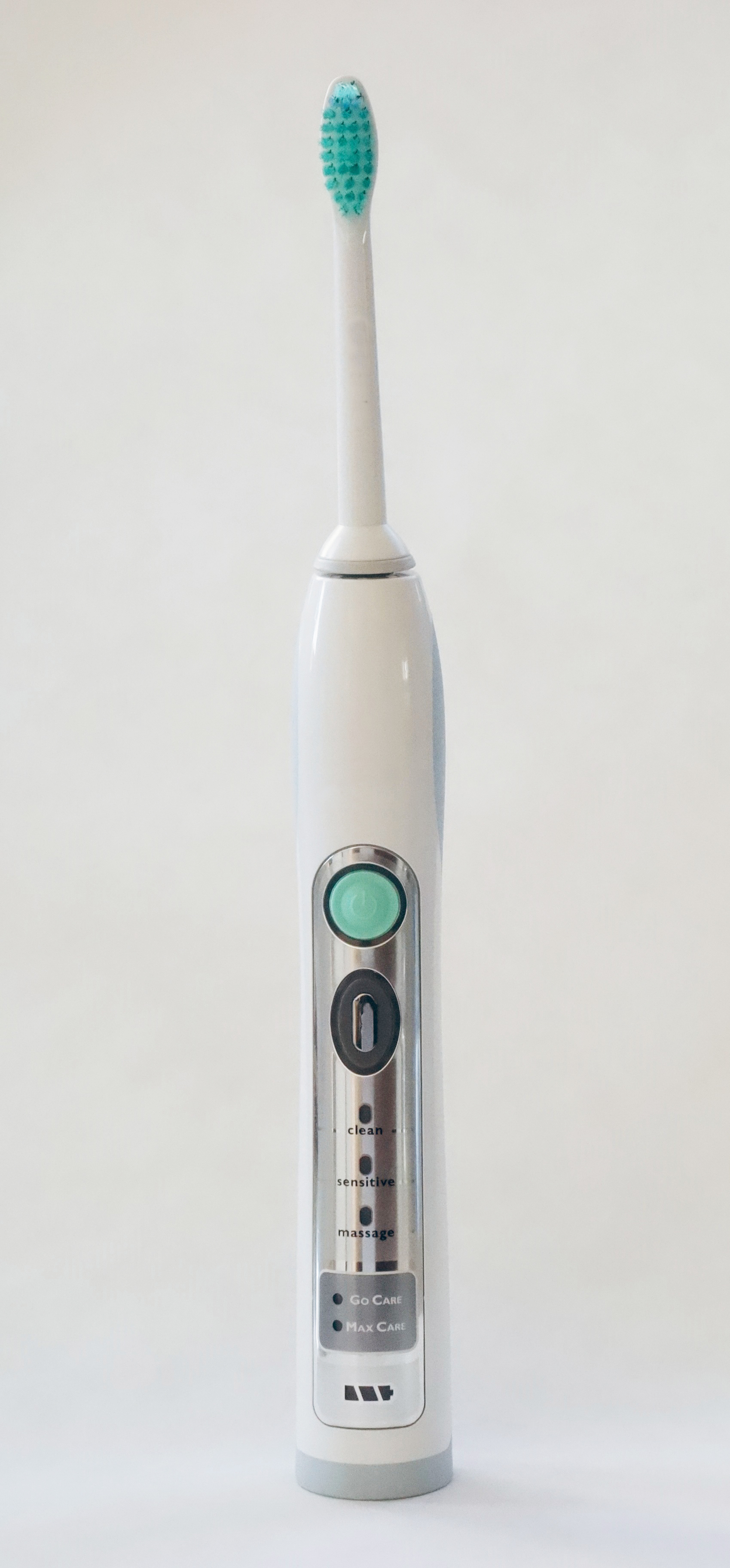
Sonic toothbrush (Sonicare)

Sonic toothbrushes are a subset of electric toothbrushes with movement that is fast enough to produce vibration in the audible range. Most modern rechargeable electric toothbrushes fall into this category and typically have frequencies that range from 200 to 400 Hz, that is, 12,000–24,000 oscillations per minute. Because sonic toothbrushes rely on sweeping motion alone to clean the teeth, the movement that they provide is often high in amplitude, so the length of the sweeping movements is large. One study found that using a sonic toothbrush causes less abrasion to the gums when compared to manual toothbrushes.

=== Ultrasonic ===
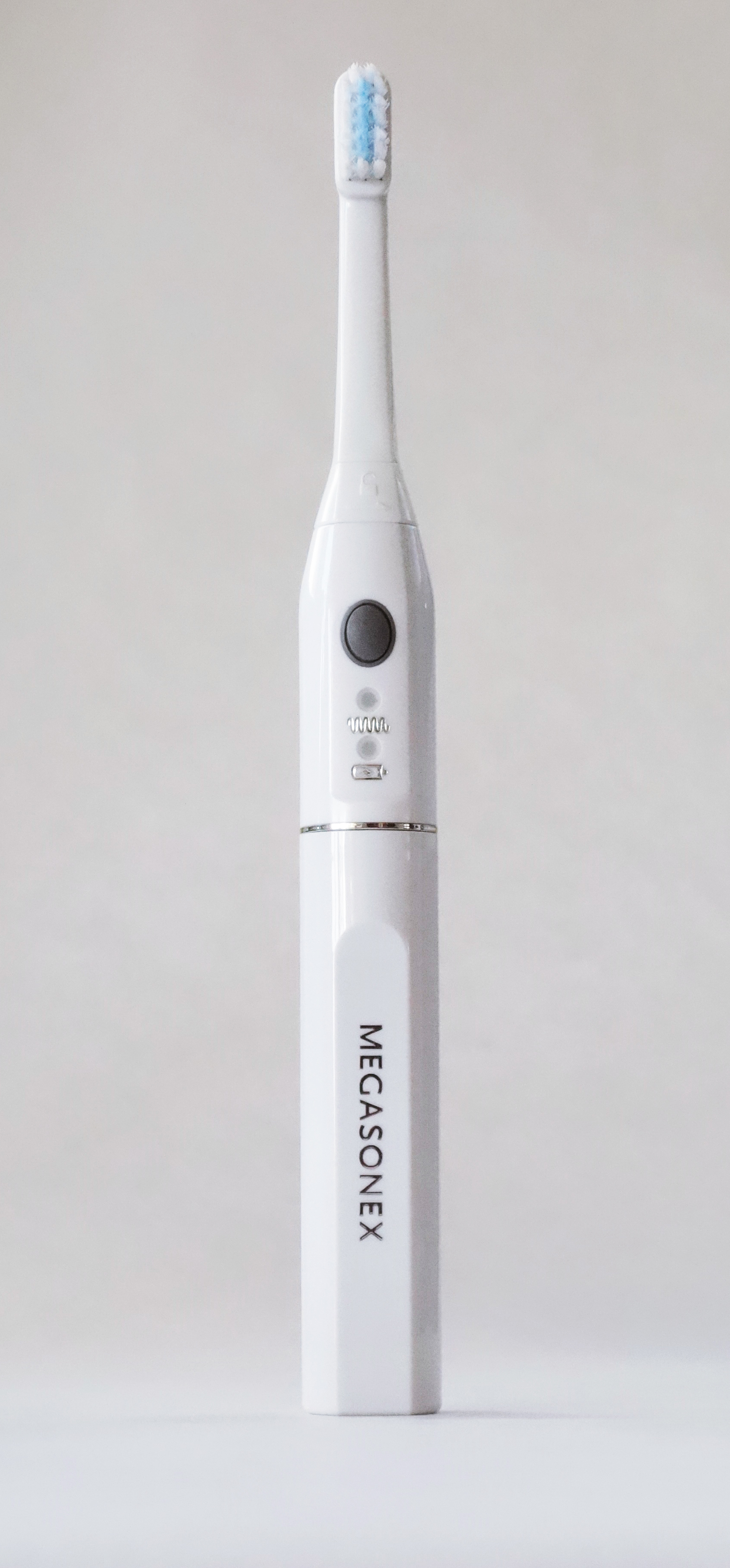
Ultrasonic toothbrush (Megasonex)

Most recently introduced in this field are ultrasonic toothbrushes, which use ultrasonic waves to clean the teeth. In order for a toothbrush to be considered "ultrasonic," it has to emit a wave at a minimum frequency of 20,000 Hz or 2.4 million movements per minute. Typically, ultrasonic toothbrushes approved by the U.S. Food and Drug Administration (FDA) operate at a frequency of 1.6 MHz, or 192 million movements per minute.

Ultrasonic toothbrushes emit vibrations with high frequency but low amplitude. These vibrations break up bacterial chains that form dental plaque and remove their methods of attachment to the tooth surface up to 5 mm below the gum line.

Some ultrasonic toothbrushes provide only ultrasonic motion. Other ultrasonic toothbrushes provide additional sonic vibration ranging from 9,000 to 40,000 movements per minute, comparable to a sonic toothbrush, in order to provide additional sweeping motion which facilitates removal of food particles and bacterial chain remnants. The sonic vibration in these ultrasonic toothbrushes may be lower in amplitude than that found in a comparable sonic toothbrush because the bacterial chains do not need to be removed through sonic vibration and swept away, as they have already been broken up by the ultrasound.

Because of the similarity of the terms "ultrasonic" and "sonic," there is some confusion in the marketplace, and sonic toothbrushes are frequently mislabeled as ultrasonic ones. A toothbrush operating at a frequency or vibration of less than 20,000 Hz is a "sonic" toothbrush. It is called "sonic" because its operating frequency, for example, 31,000 movements per minute, is within the human hearing range of between roughly 20 Hz to about 20,000 Hz. Only a toothbrush that emits ultrasound, or vibration at a frequency greater than the upper limit of human hearing, can be called an "ultrasonic" toothbrush.

== Effectiveness ==
A 2014 Cochrane review found that electric toothbrushes remove more plaque and reduce gingival inflammation compared to manual toothbrushes, showing generally greater effectiveness over manual toothbrushes. Plaque build-up and gingival inflammation were reduced by 11% and 6%, respectively, following one to three months of use. After three months of use, observed plaque reduction reached 21% and gingival inflammation was reduced by 11%. Although the scale of these differences in a clinical setting remains questionable, other reviews have reached similar conclusions. Another systematic review reported that electric toothbrushes removed more plaque on children's teeth than manual brushes. For patients with limited manual dexterity or where difficulty exists in reaching rear teeth, electric toothbrushes may be especially beneficial.

With regards to the effectiveness of different electric toothbrushes, the oscillation rotation models have been found to remove more plaque than manual toothbrushes. More specific studies have also been conducted where oscillating rotating toothbrushes have been found to be more effective than manual toothbrushes for patients undergoing orthodontic treatment. Only the oscillating rotating electric toothbrush consistently provided statistically significant benefit over manual toothbrushes in the 2014 Cochrane Review. This suggests that oscillating rotating electric toothbrushes may be more effective than other electric toothbrushes. More recent evidence also supports this, as new studies suggest that oscillating rotating toothbrushes are more effective than high-frequency sonic electric toothbrushes. Overall, oscillating rotating toothbrushes are effective in reducing gingival inflammation and plaque.

Other factors that influence effectiveness among electric toothbrushes include the amount of time spent brushing and the condition of the brush head. Manufacturers recommend that heads be changed every three months or as soon as the brush head has visibly deteriorated. Some manufacturers have added colored bristles to the brush heads, that fade over time and usage, as a visual reminder to replace the brush heads.

However, studies also show that while initial use of an electric toothbrush showed improvements to oral health, the benefits decreased with continuous use. This initial improvement was suggested to be because of the Hawthorne effect and/or because of novelty change.

== Power source and charging ==
Modern electric toothbrushes run on low voltage, generally 12 V or less. Certain units use a step-down transformer to power the brush, but most use a rechargeable and non-replaceable battery. The battery is usually fitted inside the handle, which is hermetically sealed to prevent water damage. While early NiCad battery toothbrushes used metal tabs to connect with the charging base, newer toothbrushes use inductive charging.

== Environmental concerns ==
Electric toothbrushes have a negative environmental impact compared to manual toothbrushes. As noted by Friends of the Earth, "One of these terrible products is a disposable electric toothbrush ... there's almost no way to isolate the technology from the batteries and plastic housing, thus making useful and sometimes hazardous substances disposed of at landfill sites and incinerators." The climate change impact of the electric toothbrush was reportedly 11 times higher compared to that of the bamboo toothbrush, as stated in research done for the British Dental Journal. The bamboo toothbrush is a much greener option due to being easier to recycle, or even compost.

== Optional features ==
=== Timer ===
Many modern electric toothbrushes have a timer that buzzes or briefly interrupts power, typically after two minutes, though sometimes every 30 seconds. This is associated with a recommendation to brush for two minutes, 30 seconds for each of the four quadrants of the mouth.

=== Display ===
Some electric toothbrushes have LCD screens that show brushing time and sometimes smiley face icons or other images to encourage optimal brushing. These features could encourage people to brush more accurately.

=== Pressure sensor ===
Brushing teeth too hard causes enamel and gum damage. Some electric toothbrushes include pressure sensors to prevent users from brushing too aggressively.

=== Ultrasound indicator ===
Because ultrasonic frequencies are beyond the audible range and the amplitude of movement emitted by an ultrasonic toothbrush is typically too small to be perceived, the ultrasound is imperceptible to humans, and it may not be apparent that a brush is running if pure ultrasound is turned on. Ultrasonic toothbrushes may include an indicator to notify the user that ultrasound is being emitted.

=== Bluetooth ===
Bluetooth connectivity enables data to be transmitted from an electric toothbrush to another Bluetooth device, such as a smartphone. The brush can send data to a mobile app, such as how long it has been brushing for and if too much pressure has been applied when brushing. The app can, in turn, send data back to the brush, such as changing the cleaning modes available and cleaning time. The sharing of data between a toothbrush and a smartphone is intended to assist the user in creating better brushing techniques and habits. This technology enables coaching for the user as it tracks metrics including where the user brushes and how long is spent in each area and consequently can identify areas where the user commonly misses. Several electric toothbrushes utilize Bluetooth technology.

== Cleaning modes ==
Most sonic toothbrushes come with different cleaning modes and intensity levels designed for special types of cleaning. Some of the most well-known are those meant for daily care, sensitive teeth, whitening, and tongue cleaning.

Ultrasonic toothbrushes emit ultrasound-induced vibrations of the brush head bristles, stimulating saliva flow which has been shown to remove dental biofilm even on surfaces with no contact. Since ultrasound movements are very low in amplitude, this setting may be indicated for patients who may not be suitable candidates for typical sonic or power toothbrush vibration but need the additional cleaning power of an ultrasonic toothbrush, such as patients who have recently undergone periodontal surgery.
