= William Addis (entrepreneur) =

English Business man (1734–1808)

- Born: 1734; Clerkenwell
- Died: 1808 (aged 73–74)
- Occupation: entrepreneur

William Addis (1734–1808) was an English entrepreneur believed to have produced the first mass-produced toothbrush in 1780.

== Early life and career ==
Addis was born in 1734 in England, most likely in Clerkenwell, (Note: Most online sources refer to "Clerkenwald", but no such place exists; references to Clerkenwald appear only in text about Addis; and his early history is in East London.) London.

In 1770, Addis was imprisoned in Newgate prison for causing a riot in Spitalfields. According to legend, while imprisoned, he observed the use of a broom to sweep the floor and decided that the prevalent method used to clean teeth at the time – crushed shell or soot – with a cloth was ineffective. To that end, he saved a small animal bone left over from the meal he had eaten the previous night, into which he drilled small holes. He then obtained some boar bristles from one of his guards, which he tied in tufts that he then passed through the holes in the bone, and which he finally sealed with glue.

After his release, he started a business to manufacture the toothbrushes he had built, and he soon became very rich. He died in 1808, and left the business to his eldest son, also called William, and it stayed in family ownership until 1996. Under the name Wisdom Toothbrushes, the company now manufactures 70 million toothbrushes per year in the UK.

By 1840, toothbrushes were being mass-produced in England, France, Germany, and Japan.

Hertford Museum holds approximately 5,000 toothbrushes that make up part of the Addis Collection. The Addis factory on Ware Road was a major employer in the town until 1996. Since the closure of the factory, Hertford Museum has received photographs and documents relating to the archive, and collected oral histories from former employees.
