= Little Munden Primary School =

Coordinates: 51°52′45″N 0°03′46″W

Little Munden Church of England Voluntary Controlled Primary School

Location
- Church Lane, Dane End; Ware, Hertfordshire; England

Information
- Type: Voluntary controlled school
- Religious affiliation: Church of England
- Established: 1819; 207 years ago
- Department for Education URN: 117402 Tables
- Ofsted: Reports
- Head teacher: Laura Hale
- Age: 4 to 11
- Enrolment: 70 (2017-18)
- Website: www.littlemunden.herts.sch.uk

Little Munden Primary School is a Church of England voluntary controlled primary school in the village of Dane End, near Ware in Hertfordshire. It is a one-form entry school educating boys and girls aged between four and 11 years. There are four classes organised by age and they are: Acorn Class (Nursery and Reception), Beech Class (Year 1 and Year 2), Hazel Class (Year 3 and Year 4), and finally Oak Class (Year 5 and Year 6). The school roll varies but is generally between 85 and 100.

== History ==
The school was founded in 1819 at All Saints Church in Little Munden by the Reverend J P Reynolds, who served as rector from 1819 to 1831. Reynolds helped to raise the finance for a new school on a separate site. The school was duly opened in 1826. A small extension for infants was added in 1869, and the school was further enlarged in 1900, 1970, and 1973.

Little Munden was originally a parish school serving children of all ages. In 1945, following the Education Act 1944, under which it was stipulated that all children over 11 years old should attend secondary school, Little Munden became a primary school.

== Premises ==
The school was designated as a Grade II listed building by English Heritage in 1984 as it is an early example of a parish school.

Unusually, a footpath with public right-of-way runs between the school buildings, requiring the route to be kept unobstructed.

== Academic standards ==
The Ofsted report of the inspection in February 2014 rated the overall effectiveness of the school as 'Good', point two on a four-point scale. It said "Achievement is good. From low starting points, pupils make good progress to reach average standards at the end of Year 6." and "Teaching is good. Teachers make learning enjoyable so pupils readily come to school." The assessment of 'Good' was reiterated in the report of the Short Inspection in December 2017.

== Activities ==
In 2007, Years Five and Six took part in a pilot project, working with Hertford Museum, to create an exhibition about their locality covering the period 1830–1930.

The school benefits from an active PTFA, Friends of Little Munden, who raise money for the school via a range of community events held throughout the year. These include the Dane End Summer Festival and Christmas Parade.
