= Hertford Museum =

Local museum in Hertford, Hertfordshire, England

Coordinates: 51.7972°N 0.0780°W

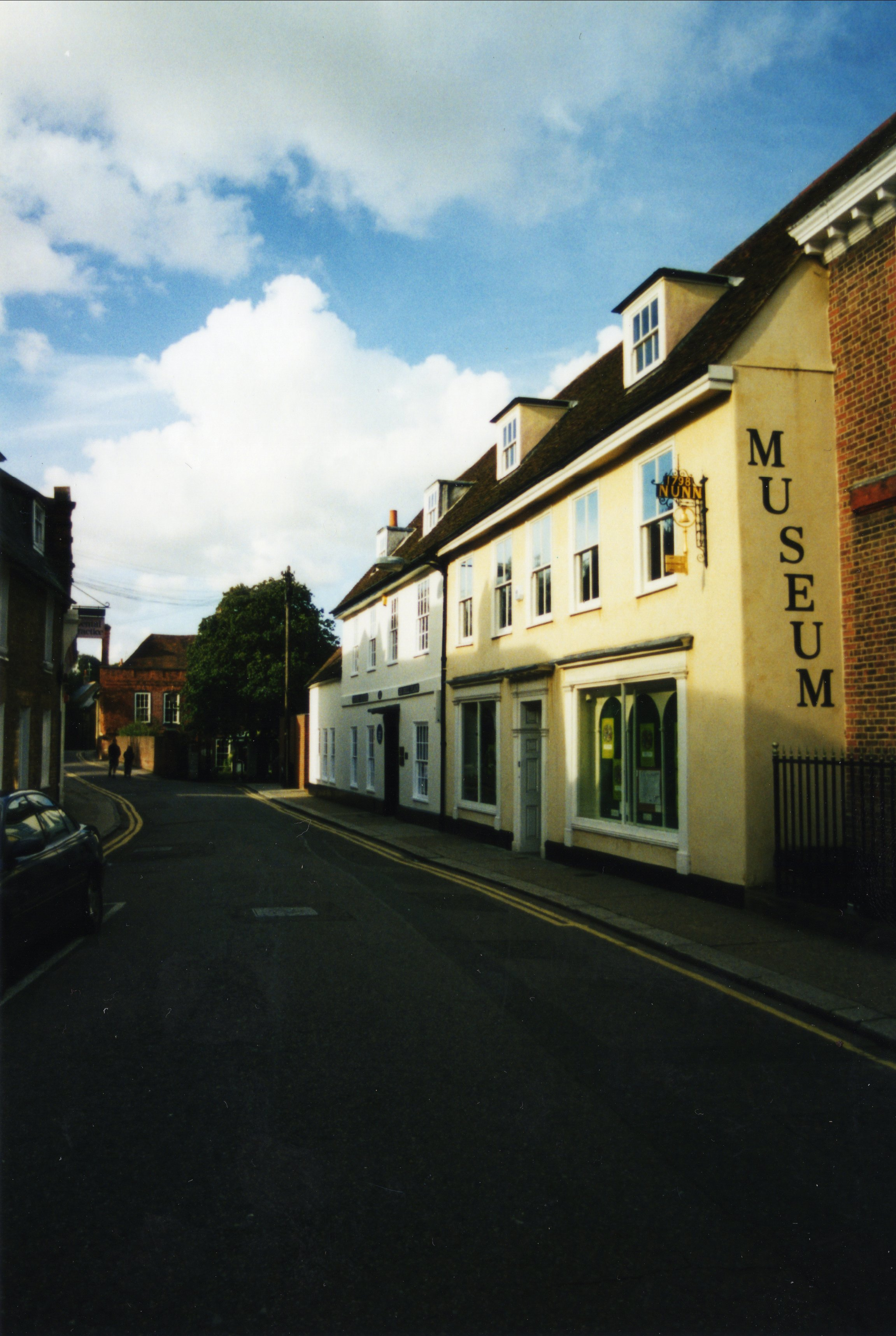
View of Hertford Museum.

Hertford Museum is a local museum in Hertford, the county town of Hertfordshire, England.

The museum first opened in 1903 and is located in a 17th-century town house with a Jacobean-style knot garden. The galleries on the ground floor present the early history of the museum. Objects include exotic animals, fossils, and Japanese armour. The first floor presents the town and people of Hertford. The collections cover local, military, natural and social history, as well as archaeology, fine art, and geology.

The museum holds approximately 5,000 toothbrushes that make up part of the Addis Collection. The Addis factory on Ware Road was a major employer in the town until 1996. Since the closure of the factory, Hertford Museum has received photographs and documents relating to the archive, and collected oral histories from former employees.

The museum undertakes educational activities with schools. For example, Little Munden Primary School took part in a pilot project, working with the museum, to create an exhibition about their locality covering the period 1830–1930.

The museum closed in Winter 2008 for major refurbishment, largely funded by a Heritage Grant from the UK Heritage Lottery Fund. It reopened on 27 February 2010.

== See also ==
- Hertford Castle
- List of museums in Hertfordshire
