= Ultrasonic toothbrush =

Type of electric toothbrush

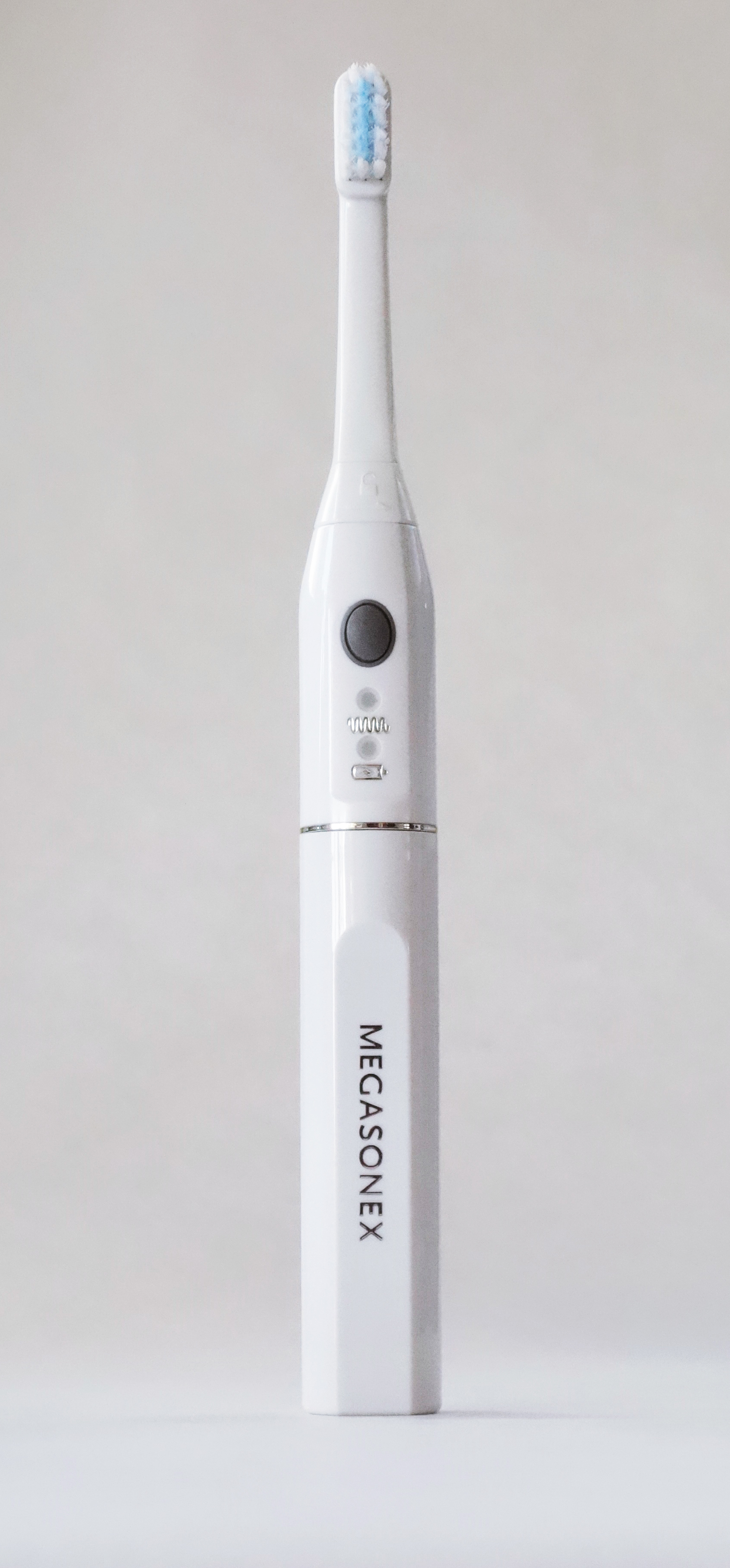
Ultrasonic toothbrush (Megasonex)

An ultrasound toothbrush is an electric toothbrush designed for daily home use that operates by generating ultrasound in order to aid in removing plaque and rendering plaque bacteria harmless. It typically operates on a frequency of 1.6 MHz, which translates to 96,000,000 pulses or 192,000,000 movements per minute. Ultrasound is defined as a series of acoustic pressure waves generated at a frequency beyond human hearing.

== Background ==
Electric toothbrushes have been used by the public since the early 1950s. Today, they have evolved and based on the speed of their vibration, can be divided into three categories: electric, sonic and ultrasonic.

Electric toothbrushes vibrate in either an up/down direction, or in a circular motion, and sometimes in a combination of the two. Typically, the speed of their vibration is measured in movements per minute, where common electric toothbrushes vibrate at a speed of between a few thousand times a minute to approximately 10,000 to 12,000 times per minute. Sonic toothbrushes are called sonic because the speed or frequency of their vibration, as opposed to the sound of the motor, falls within the average range that is used by people in communication. The voiced speech of a typical adult male will have a fundamental frequency from 85 to 180 Hz (10,200 to 21,000 movements per minute), and that of a typical adult female from 165 to 255 Hz (19,800 to 30,600 movements per minute). Ultrasonic toothbrushes work by generating an ultrasonic wave usually from an implanted piezo crystal, the frequency of which is in the range of 20,000 Hz (2,400,000 movements per minute). The most common frequency however, around which many scientific studies have been conducted, is in the area of approximately 1.6 MHz, which translates to 96,000,000 waves or 192,000,000 movements per minute.

== History ==
The first ultrasonic toothbrush, initially branded Ultima and later Ultrasonex by Sonex Corporation, was first patented in the USA in 1992 by Robert T. Bock, the same year the FDA gave it approval for daily home use. Initially, the Ultima worked only on ultrasound. A few years later, a motor was added to the Ultrasonex brush, which provided additional sonic vibration. Sonex was then sold to Salton, Inc., who began distributing the product in many countries, including the USA. In 2008, Salton Corporation's new owners decide to exit the oral hygiene market and since then, several new companies started selling ultrasonic toothbrushes such as the Ultreo, Megasonex, and Emmi-Dent brands. In addition, in late 2012, Robert T. Bock created a new Ultrasonic toothbrush, the Smilex Ultrasonic Toothbrush using updated technology. Today, most ultrasonic toothbrushes simultaneously work in the ultrasonic mode together with sonic vibration. As of November 2018, the only Ultrasonic toothbrushes being marketed are the brands Emmi-Dent and Megasonex.

== Effectiveness ==
Ultrasound, in the range of 1.0 to 3.0 MHz is used in some therapeutic medical devices to plaque removal.

In addition, ultrasonic toothbrushes may reduce the need for vigorous brushing, potentially lowering the risk of gingival abrasion or enamel wear, making them suitable for people with sensitive teeth or gum recession.

== Safety of ultrasound ==
Ultrasound has been used in medicine for close to half a century and its safety has been studied for almost the same period of time. In 1992, the US FDA first allowed the use of ultrasound at a frequency of 1.6 MHz in a toothbrush. In 1993, the American Institute of Ultrasound in Medicine (AIUM), in conjunction with the National Electrical Manufacturers Association (NEMA) developed the Output Display Standard (ODS), including the thermal index and mechanical index which have been incorporated into the FDA's new regulations. These regulations limit the power output of these devices to a level low enough to avoid raising surrounding tissue temperature by more than 1 °C.
