= Sonicare =

Philips electric toothbrush brand

Sonicare is the brand name of an electric toothbrush produced by Philips.

== History ==
In 1987, David Giuliani, an entrepreneur with a background in electrical engineering, met with University of Washington professors Drs. David Engel and Roy Martin. They formed a new company named GEMTech to promote a dental hygiene device using a piezoelectric multimorph transducer. After several years of research and creating prototypes, the Sonicare toothbrush was introduced in 1992.

In 1995, GEMTech changed its name to Optiva Corporation. The company was originally headquartered in Bellevue, Washington, and moved to Snoqualmie, Washington, in 1999. The 176,000 square feet (16,400 m^{2}) plant in Snoqualmie was later supplemented by an additional facility in Auburn, Washington. In October 2000, Philips Domestic Appliances and Personal Care, a division of Philips, acquired the company. A few months later Optiva Corporation changed its name to Philips Oral Healthcare, Inc. By the end of 2001, Sonicare had become the number-one selling rechargeable power toothbrush in the United States. In 2003, to improve Philips brand recognition in the US, Philips rebranded the Sonicare toothbrush as "Philips Sonicare".

== Product and technology ==
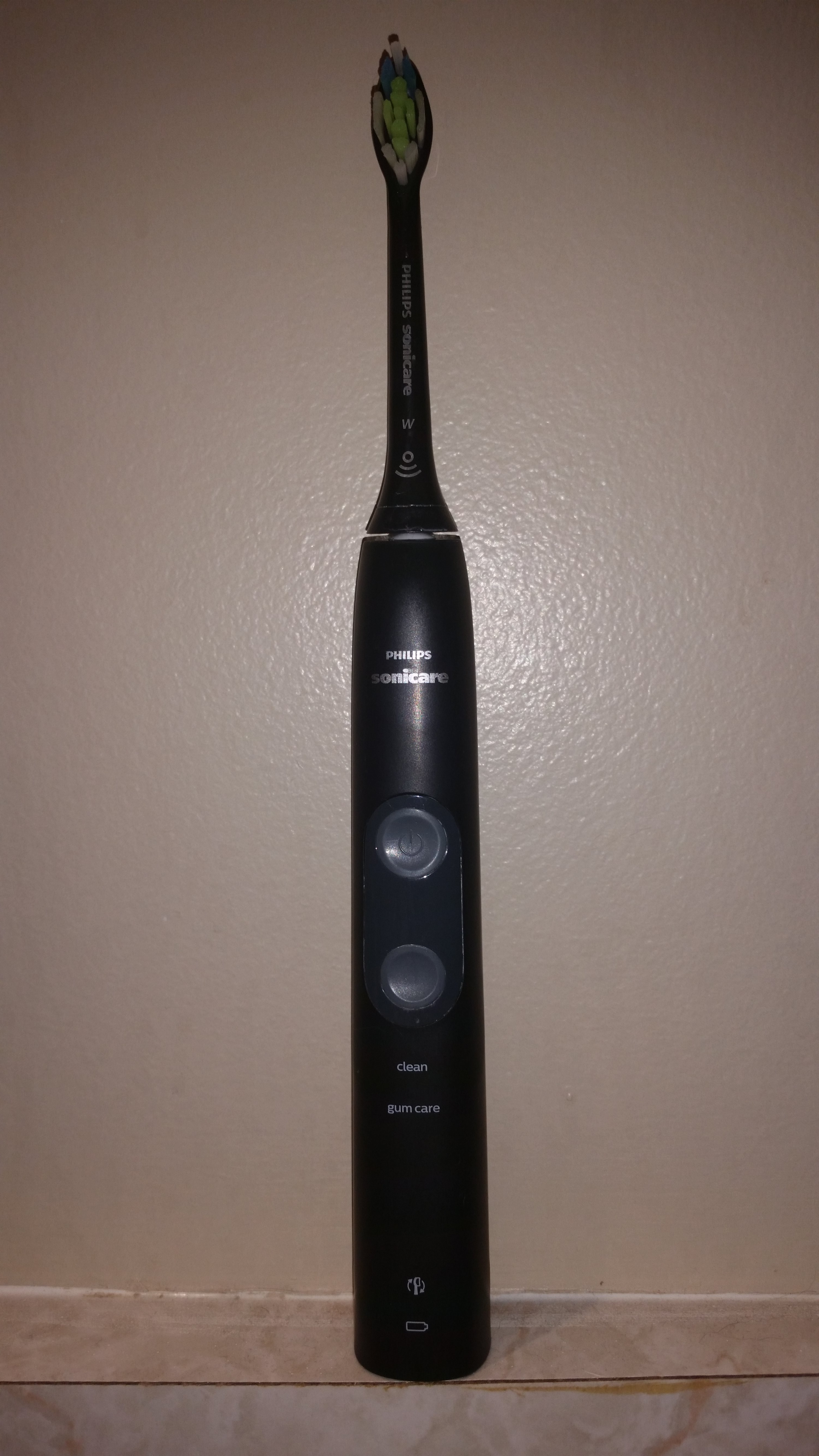
A Philips Sonicare 5100. This model has 2 cleaning modes

The brush head vibrates at hundreds of times per second, with the latest models at 31,000 strokes per minute (517 Hz) or 62,000 "movements" per minute (517 Hz). Rather than connecting to its charger with conductors, it uses inductive charging—the charger includes the primary winding of the voltage-reducing transformer and the handle of the brush includes the secondary winding. The replaceable head is also driven magnetically. Currently, there are multiple types of Sonicare brushes.

== Effectiveness ==
Based on 10 relevant studies, a 2014 Cochrane review concluded that electric toothbrushes with side-to-side lateral motion, including Sonicare brushes, were similarly effective as manual toothbrushes in reducing dental plaque and gingivitis. A 2004 review found that the Oral-B toothbrush with oscillating rotating motion removed plaque more thoroughly than Sonicare toothbrushes; the review also identified that the laboratory studies demonstrating the plaque elimination effect of the Sonicare toothbrush's "dynamic fluid activity" were not replicated in well-controlled clinical studies.

== See also ==
- Electric toothbrush
