= Crest Whitestrips =

Tooth whitening product

Crest Whitestrips is a line of tooth whitening products made by Procter & Gamble.

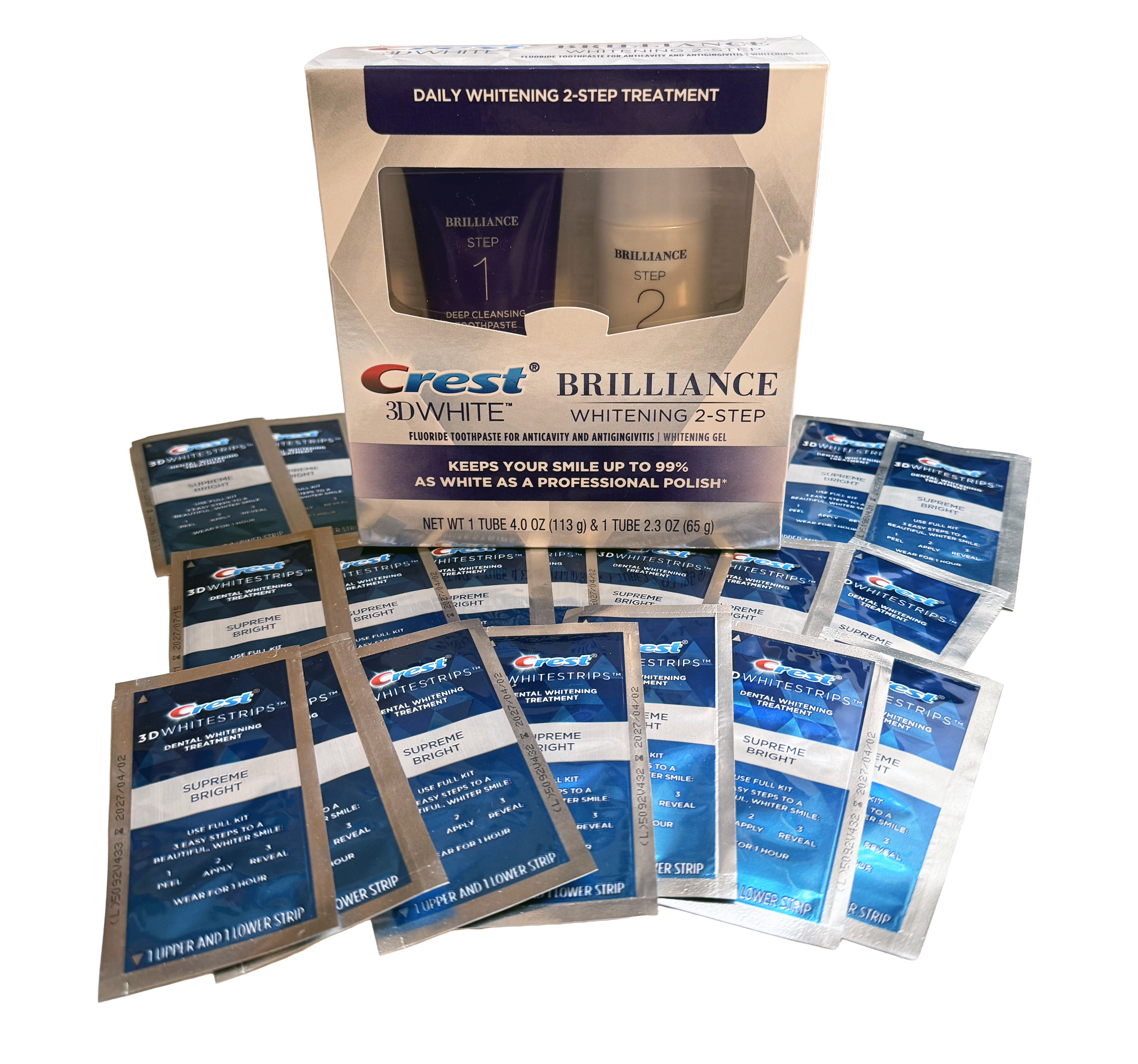
Crest white strips laying in front of Crest whitening toothpaste and gel

== Description ==
Crest Whitestrips were announced in 2000 and introduced in 2001. The product is used by placing a disposable plastic strip directly onto the teeth that contains an enamel-safe whitening gel. It is reported to be most effective on yellow and heavily stained teeth.

In 2010, the "3D" range of Whitestrips was introduced. The new "Advanced Seal" was a technological advancement from the older Crest Whitestrips. The strips are now non-slip, and also whiten more teeth because each strip is longer. These are available with the strongest retail 3D Advanced Vivid and 3D Professional Effects Whitestrips.

U.S. dentists also offer a specialized Crest Whitestrips called "Supreme", which is more effective than retail versions due to the higher concentration of hydrogen peroxide.

Possible side effects from Whitestrips usage include gum irritation and white spots on the teeth for a few hours after use. Sensitivity can also temporarily occur. Whitestrips can also have a bleaching effect if they come in contact with clothing or skin. Whitestrips are not for use by children under the age of 12, while Crest Whitestrips Supreme should not be used in persons under the age of 18. The active ingredient is hydrogen peroxide.

According to a 2009 article in The Washington Post, Consumer Reports found Crest Whitestrips Supreme to be the best of the eight teeth whitening products it tested. This product was the most expensive kit tested by Consumer Reports.

=== Ingredients ===
Crest Whitestrips contain water, glycerin, hydrogen peroxide, carbomer 956, and sodium saccharin. Crest Whitestrips Professional Effects (Hong Kong Version) contains water, glycerin, carbomer 956, sodium hydroxide, and sodium saccharin.

== Usage ==
Crest 3D White Whitestrips only whiten natural teeth. The strips do not whiten caps, crowns, veneers, fillings or dentures. They are not to be used with dental braces, loose teeth or temporary or loose restorations. Crest recommends that if customers are in need of dental work, have had dental work or have staining from medication, they ask a dentist if tooth whitening is appropriate.

== Summary of products ==
Model	Availability	Introduced	Length of use	Duration of whiteness
Crest Whitestrips Classic previously Crest Whitestrips	Discontinued	May 2001	14 days	12 months
Crest Whitestrips Professional	Discontinued	2001	10 days	12 months
Crest Whitestrips Supreme	Dentist and online	September 2003	21 days	18 months
Crest Whitestrips Premium	Discontinued	January 2004	7 days	12 months
Crest Whitestrips Pro previously Crest Whitestrips Premium Plus	Discontinued	April 2005	10 days	18 months
Crest Whitestrips Renewal	Discontinued	January 2006	10 days	18 months
Crest Whitestrips Daily Multicare	Discontinued	March 2007	Daily	White after using system
Crest Whitestrips Advanced Seal	Discontinued	February 2009	14 days	18 months
Crest 3D Intensive Professional Effects	Discontinued	2011	7 days	12 months
Crest Whitestrips 3D Vivid	In store and online	2009	10 days	12 months
Crest Whitestrips 3D Advanced Vivid	In store and online	March 2010	14 days	12 months
Crest Whitestrips 3D Professional Effects	In store and online	March 2010	20 days	12 months
Crest 3D White 2 Hour Express	In store and online	2010	2 hours	3 months
Crest 3D White Supreme FlexFit	Online, Dentist, In store	2013	14 days	18 months

== Strengths available ==
- Crest Whitestrips Supreme has 100 mg of gel with 14% hydrogen peroxide (14 mg) of hydrogen peroxide per upper strip.
- Crest Whitestrips Professional has 200 mg of gel with 6.5% hydrogen peroxide per upper strip.
- Crest Whitestrips Professional Effects (Hong Kong Version) has 200 mg of gel with (14 mg) of sodium hydroxide as active ingredient.

== See also ==
- Crest (toothpaste)
- Tooth whitening
- Listerine
- Cosmetic dentistry
