= Philips =

Dutch multinational technology company

Koninklijke Philips N.V.
- Logo since 2013

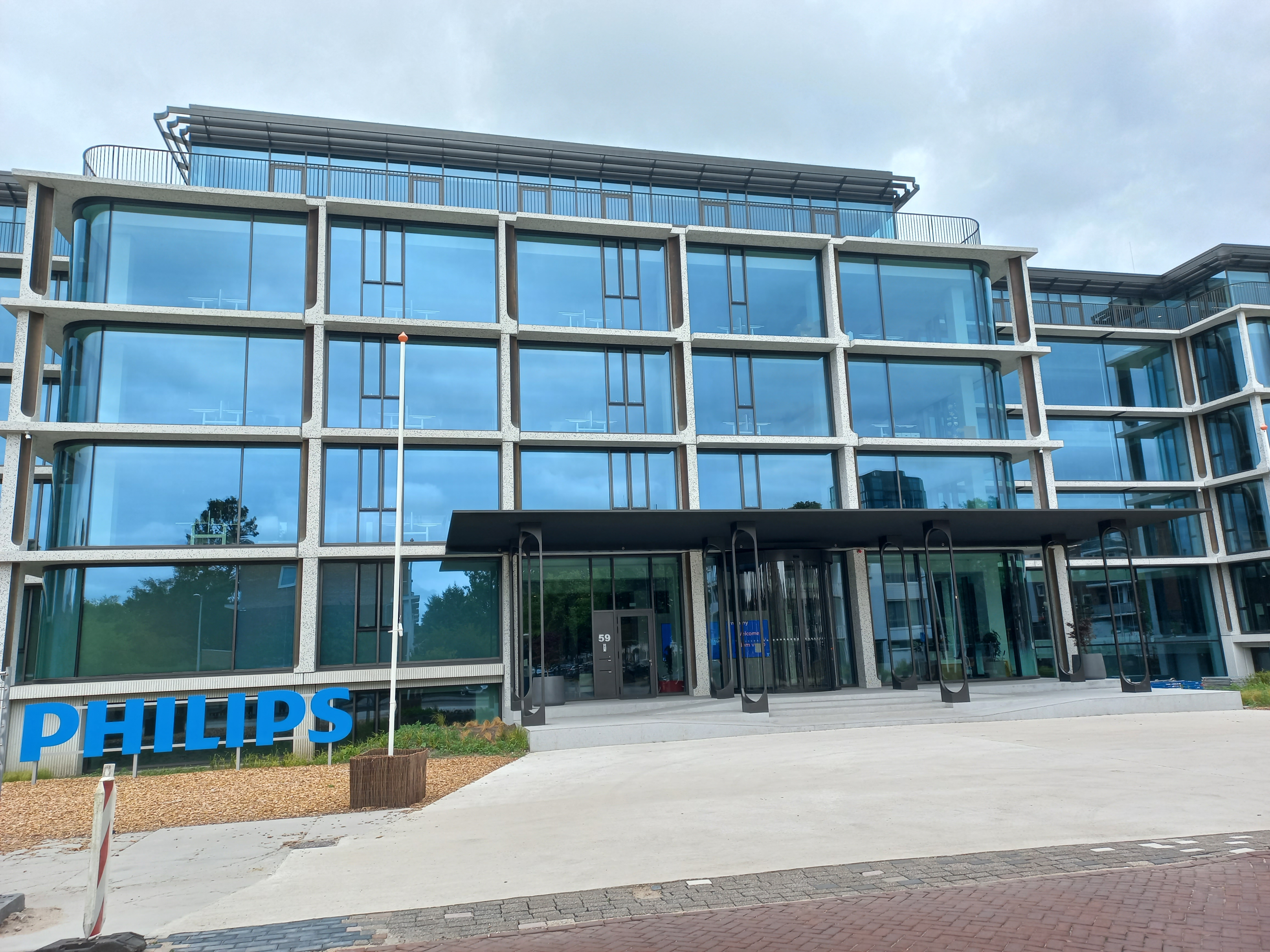
- Headquarters in Amsterdam, 2026
- Formerly: Firma Philips & Co (1891–1912); N.V. Philips' Gloeilampenfabrieken (1912–1994); Philips Electronics N.V. (1994–1998); Koninklijke Philips Electronics N.V. (1998–2013)
- Type: Public
- Traded as: Euronext Amsterdam: PHIA; NYSE: PHG; AEX component
- Industry: Health technology
- Founded: 15 May 1891; 135 years ago in Eindhoven, Netherlands
- Founders: Gerard and Anton Philips
- Headquarters: Amsterdam, Netherlands
- Area served: Worldwide
- Key people: Feike Sijbesma (chairman); Roy Jakobs (CEO); Charlotte Hanneman (CFO)
- Products: Medical equipment; Intellectual property management and licensing (for divested businesses of Philips, such as audiovisual equipment and lighting)
- Revenue: ▼€18.02 billion (2024)
- Operating income: ▲€529 million (2024)
- Net income: ▲€698 million (2024)
- Total assets: ▼€28.98 billion (2024)
- Total equity: ▼€12.04 billion (2024)
- Number of employees: 68,419 (2024)
- Website: philips.com

Koninklijke Philips N.V., commonly known as Philips, is a Dutch multinational health technology company and former major consumer electronics manufacturer. The company was founded in Eindhoven in 1891 by Gerard Philips and his father Frederik Philips to manufacture incandescent light bulbs. In October 1997, Philips decided to move its corporate headquarters from Eindhoven to Amsterdam, with the relocation beginning the following year. The company's headquarters remain in Amsterdam. Philips was awarded the Dutch Royal designation by Queen Wilhelmina in 1916; Koninklijke became part of the company name in 1998.

Through the 20th century, Philips developed into a large electronics conglomerate, producing products ranging from kitchen appliances and electric shavers to lighting equipment and televisions. Philips introduced the compact cassette format, which became a widely adopted standard for tape recording. The company later collaborated with Sony in developing the compact disc standard. Philips also became a major participant in the entertainment industry through its controlling interest in PolyGram, which it sold to Seagram in 1998.

From the 2010s, Philips progressively shifted its focus toward health technology. Its television business was transferred to the TP Vision joint venture in 2012. Its lighting business was separated from Philips in 2016 and renamed Signify in 2018. Philips completed the sale of its Domestic Appliances business in 2021; the independent company was renamed Versuni in 2023.

As of 2025, Philips reports three main business segments: Diagnosis & Treatment, Connected Care and Personal Health. Diagnosis & Treatment includes image-guided therapy and precision diagnosis, including technologies used for MRI, CT and ultrasound. Connected Care includes patient monitoring, enterprise informatics, and sleep and respiratory care, including activities associated with Respironics. Personal Health includes personal care, oral healthcare, and mother-and-child-care products, including electric shavers, Sonicare electric toothbrushes and Avent products.

Philips is listed on Euronext Amsterdam under the symbol PHIA and on the New York Stock Exchange under the symbol PHG. It is also a component of the Euro Stoxx 50 index. Historical acquisitions included Signetics in 1975 and Magnavox in 1974. The Philips Sports Association, which includes the football club PSV Eindhoven, was founded in 1913 for Philips employees.

== History ==
=== Founding and early expansion ===
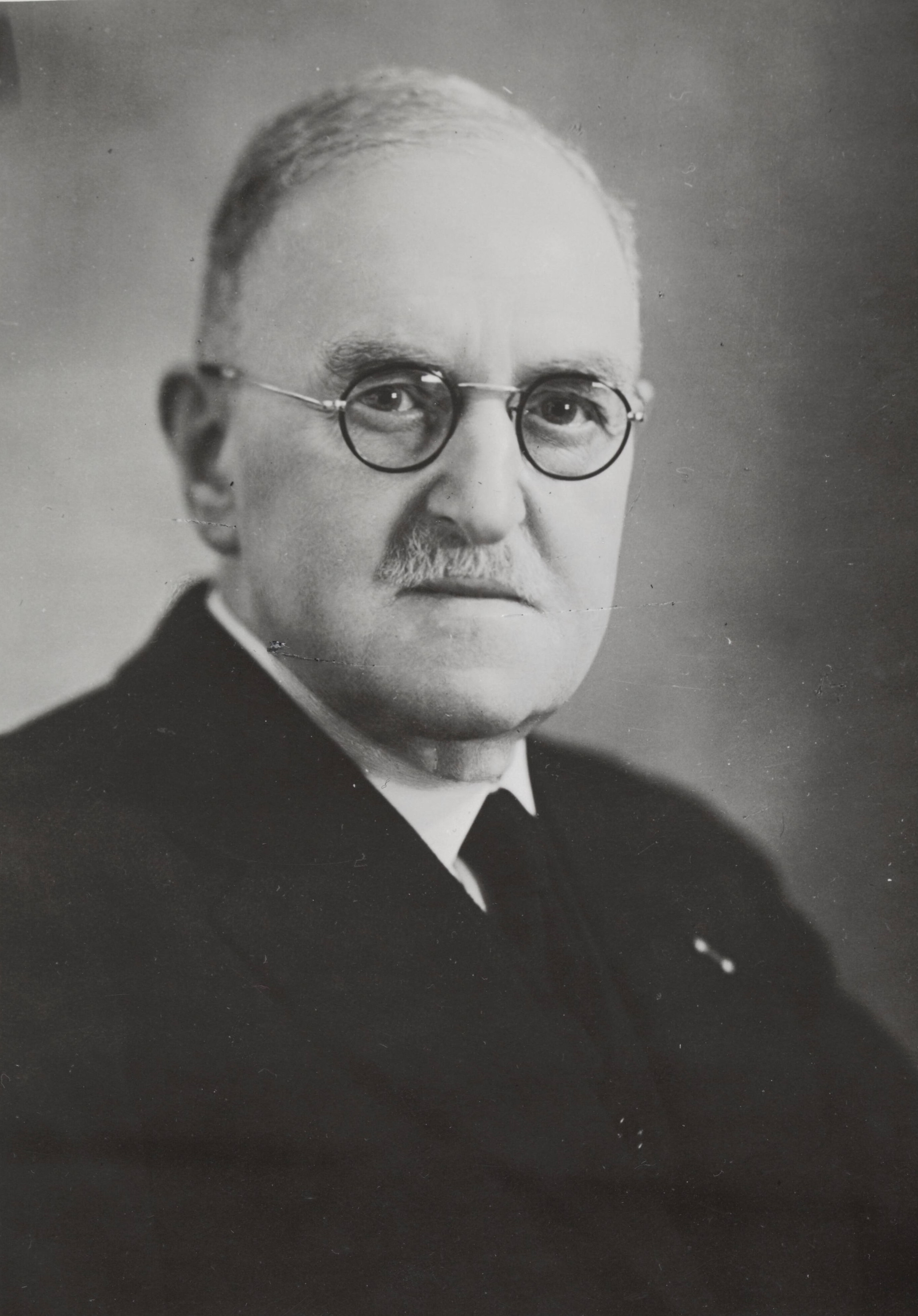
Gerard Philips (1858–1942), founder

Philips & Co. was founded in Eindhoven in 1891 by Gerard Philips and his father Frederik Philips to manufacture incandescent electric lamps. Gerard's younger brother Anton Philips joined the company in 1895 and helped expand its commercial operations.

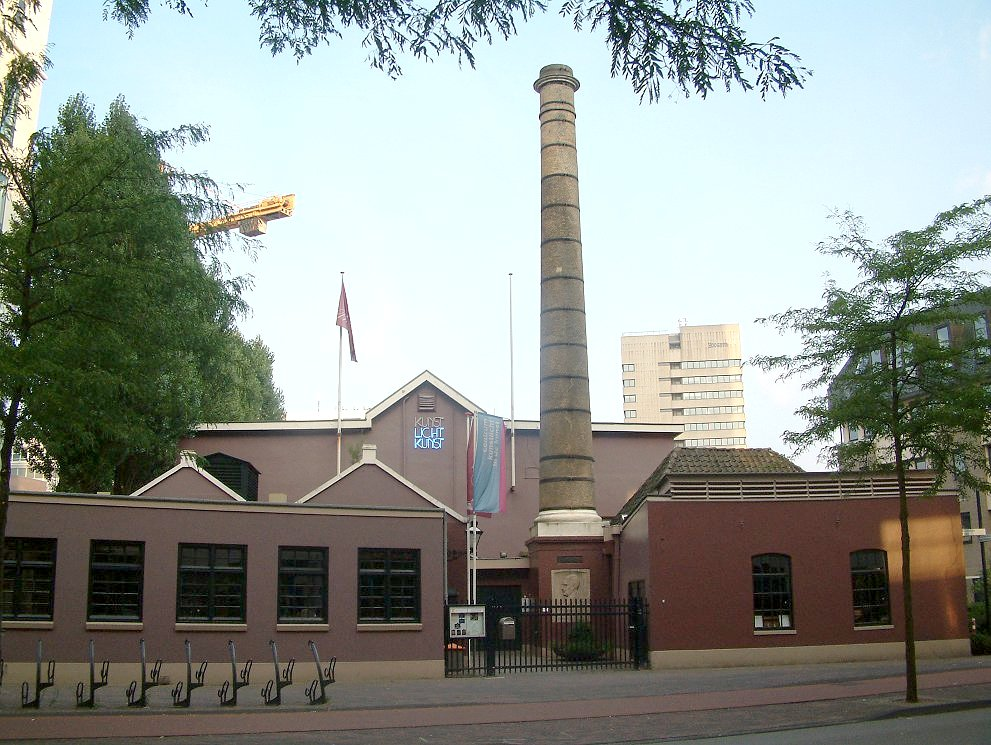
The first Philips factory in Eindhoven, now a public museum, July 2008

The business was converted into N.V. Philips' Gloeilampenfabrieken on 11 September 1912. Philips opened its physics laboratory, later known as the NatLab, in 1914. Research at the laboratory contributed to the company's later work in lighting, radio technology and medical X-ray equipment.

Philips received the Dutch Royal designation from Queen Wilhelmina in 1916, although Koninklijke did not become part of the company's legal name until 1998. In 1924, Philips joined other major lamp manufacturers, including Osram, in the Phoebus cartel.

=== Radio and consumer products ===
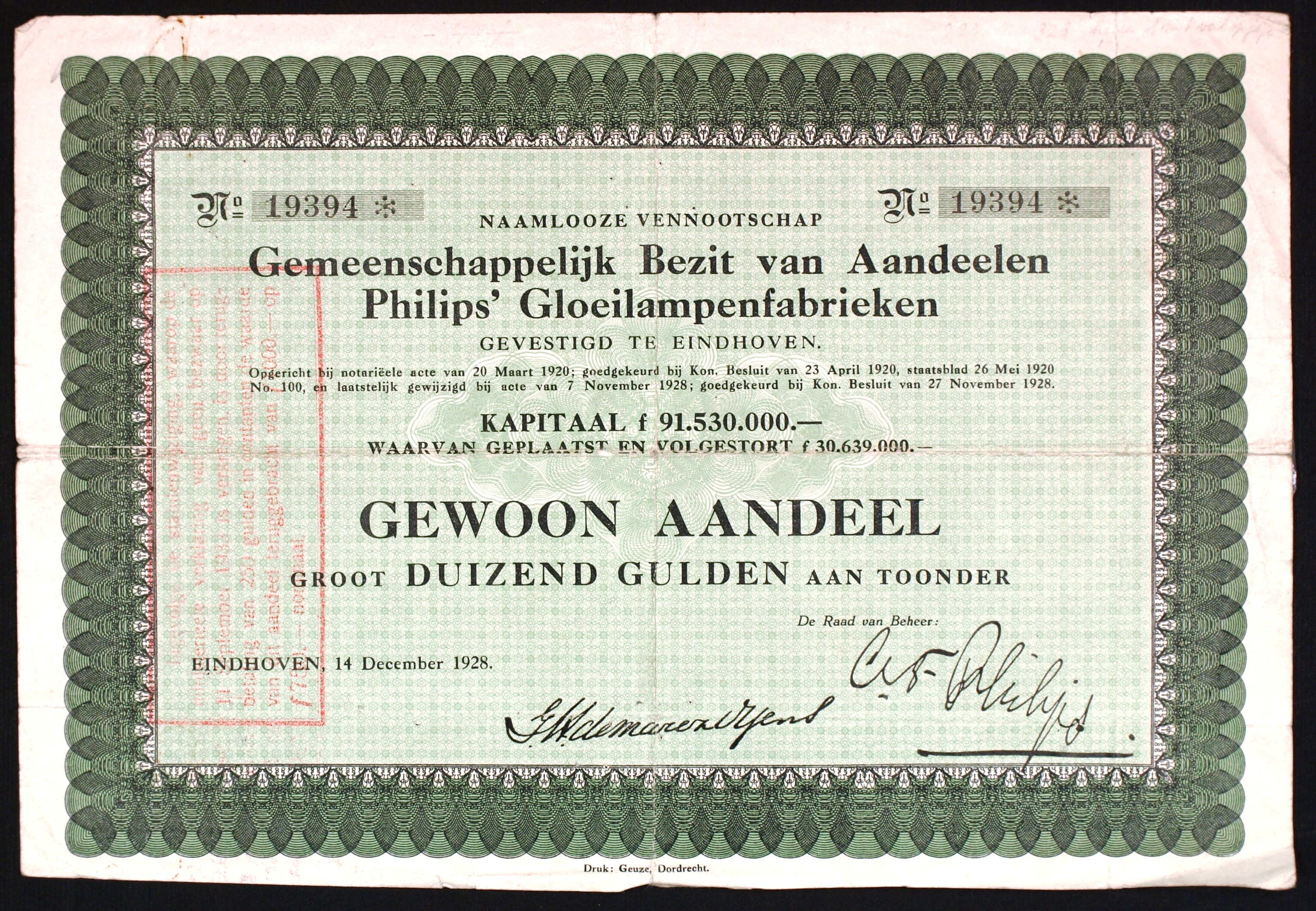
A share of the Philips Gloeilampenfabrieken, issued 14 December 1928

In March 1927, experimental shortwave transmissions from the Philips laboratories in Eindhoven using the PCJJ transmitter were received in the Dutch East Indies. Philips subsequently participated in international shortwave broadcasting, including broadcasts associated with Philips Omroep Holland-Indië (PHOHI).

Eddie Startz began presenting the Happy Station through PCJJ in 1928. The program later continued on Dutch international radio after the Second World War.

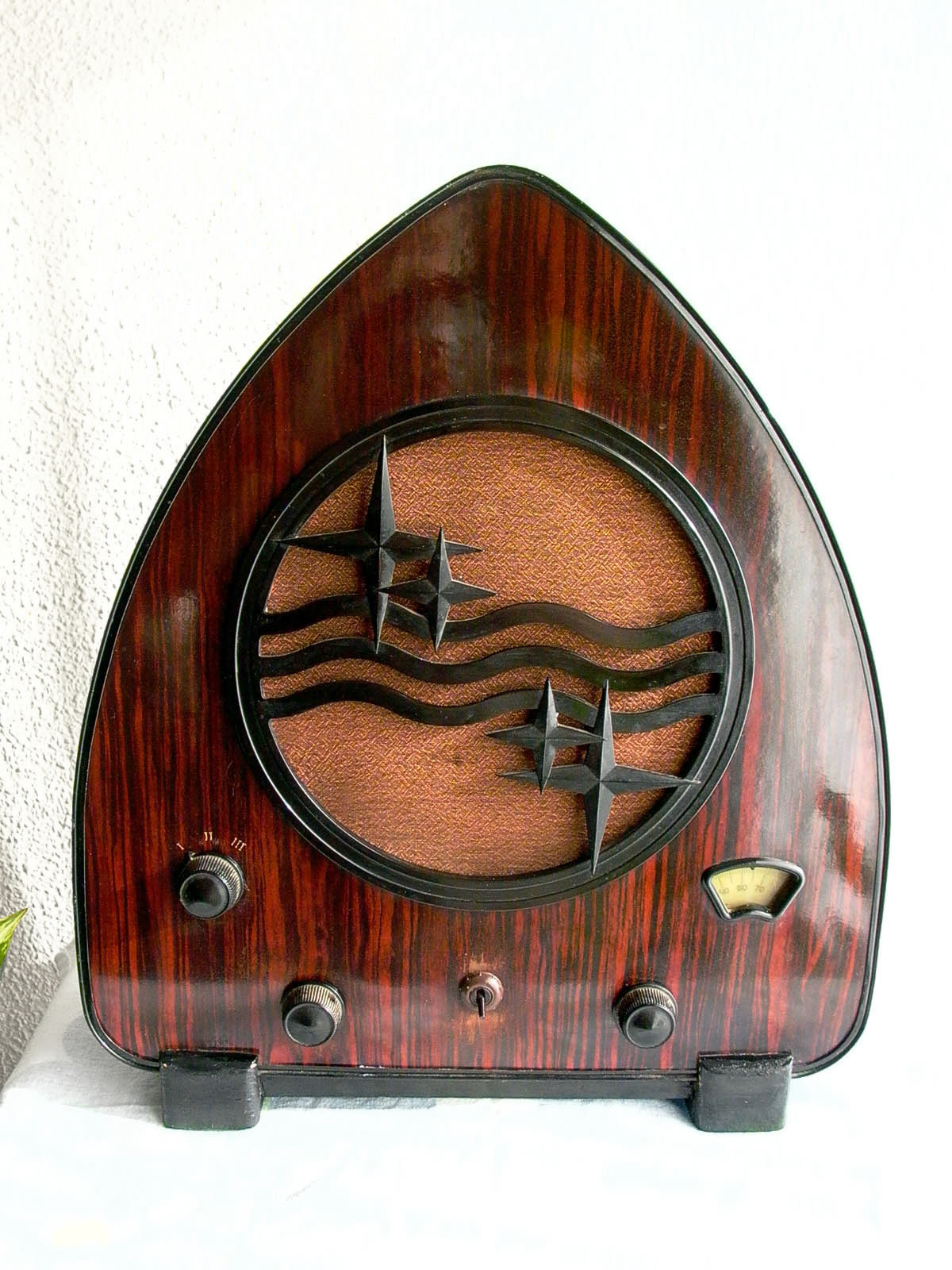
Philips "Chapel" radio model 930A, 1931

During the 1930s, Philips expanded its consumer-electronics activities. In 1939, the company introduced the Philishave rotary electric shaver, invented by Philips engineer Alexandre Horowitz.

=== Stirling-engine research ===
Philips played a role in the 20th-century revival of the Stirling engine. During the 1930s, engineers at the company's research laboratory investigated the engine as a possible source of power for portable radio equipment in places where mains electricity or reliable batteries were unavailable.

Development continued during and after World War II. By the late 1940s, Philips had developed a generator set known as the MP1002CA, or "Bungalow set". Falling power requirements for transistor radios, however, reduced the commercial need for such generators.

Philips continued research into Stirling technology for several decades. One practical application was the reversed Stirling engine used as a cryocooler.

=== World War II ===
Following the German invasion of the Netherlands in May 1940, several senior Philips executives left the country, while Frits Philips, the son of Anton Philips, remained in Eindhoven.

On 6 December 1942, the Royal Air Force carried out Operation Oyster, a low-level bombing raid against Philips industrial sites in Eindhoven that were producing components used by the German war economy. The raid severely damaged Philips facilities and also caused substantial civilian casualties and destruction in surrounding parts of Eindhoven.

During the German occupation, a workshop staffed by Jewish prisoners operated at the Vught concentration camp for Philips-related production. Of 469 Jewish prisoners who worked there, 382 were alive at the end of the war. Frits Philips was later recognized by Yad Vashem as one of the Righteous Among the Nations for his efforts to protect Jewish workers.

=== Postwar expansion and consumer electronics ===
A Phillips technician operating a mastering console in Australia, 1973

After World War II, Philips rebuilt and expanded its operations. The company became a major producer of televisions, audio equipment and other consumer electronics while continuing its activities in lighting and medical technology.

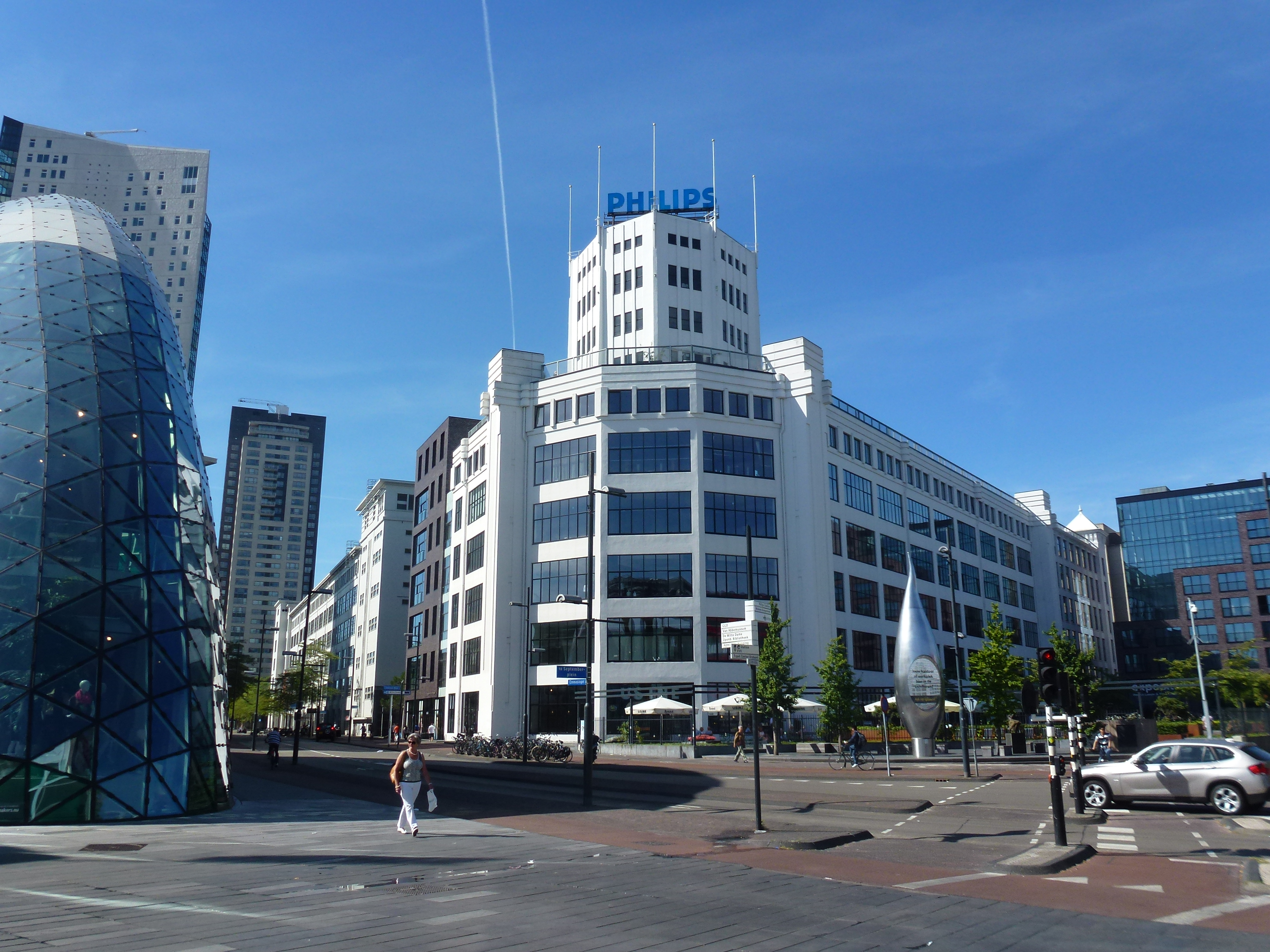
The Philips Light Tower in Eindhoven, originally a light-bulb factory and later used as company offices, August 2012

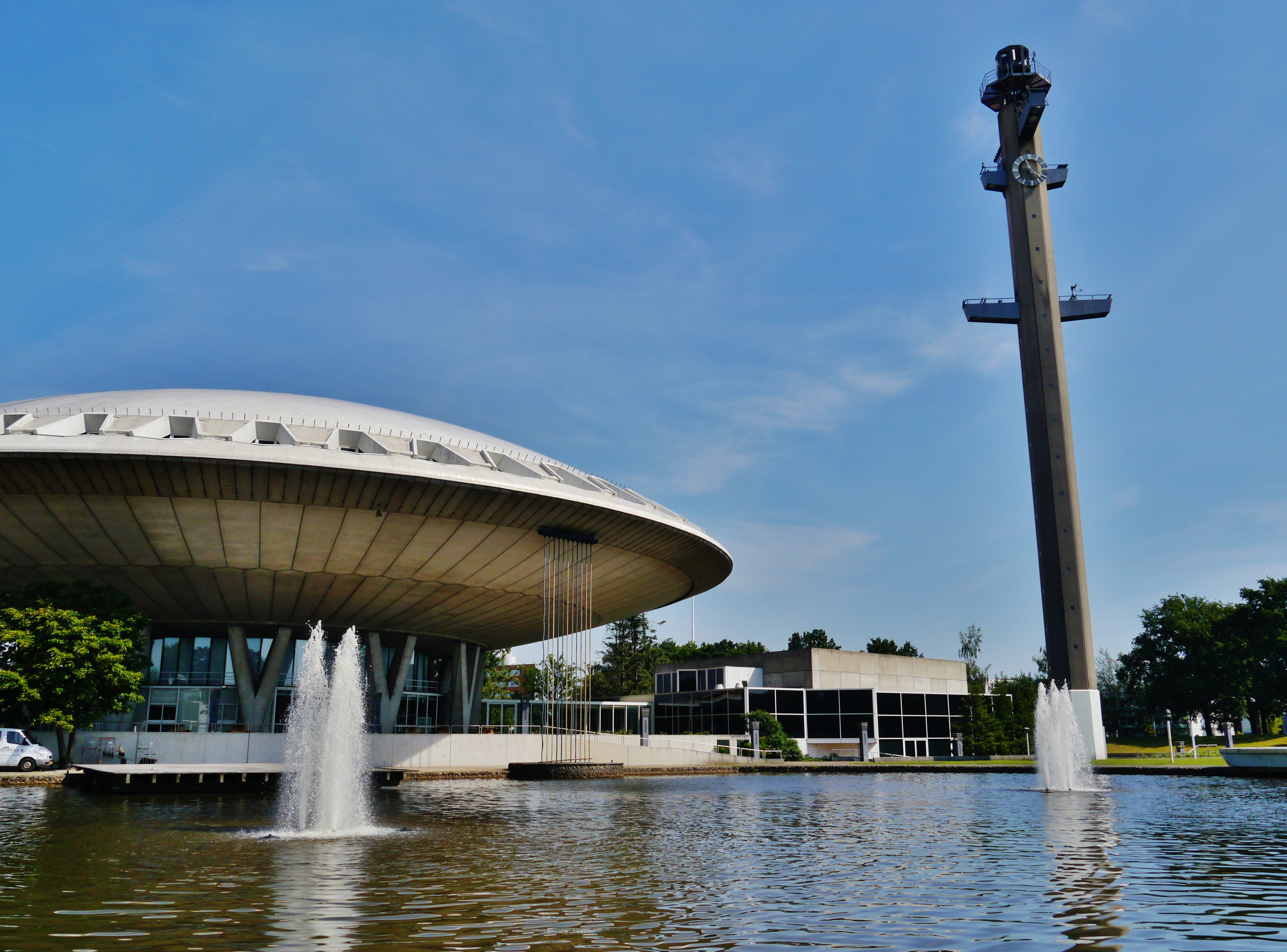
The Evoluon in Eindhoven, opened in 1966, August 2015

In August 1963, Philips introduced its first Compact Cassette recorder at the Funkausstellung exhibition in Berlin. The Compact Cassette subsequently became an international standard for recorded and recordable audio.

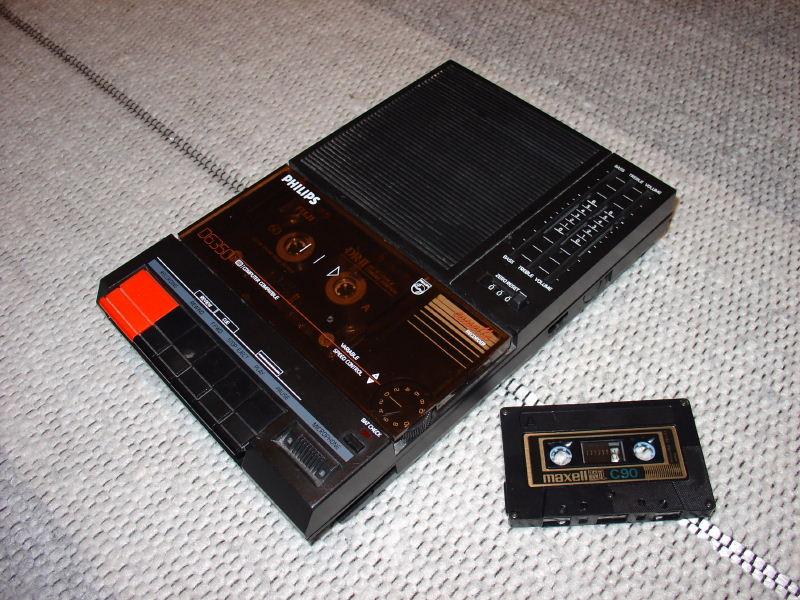
An early portable Compact Cassette recorder by Philips (model D6350)

In the early 1970s, Philips introduced the N1500 videocassette recorder. The Science Museum Group describes the N1500 as the first practical domestic video recorder; it incorporated a television tuner and timer and recorded programs onto video cassettes.

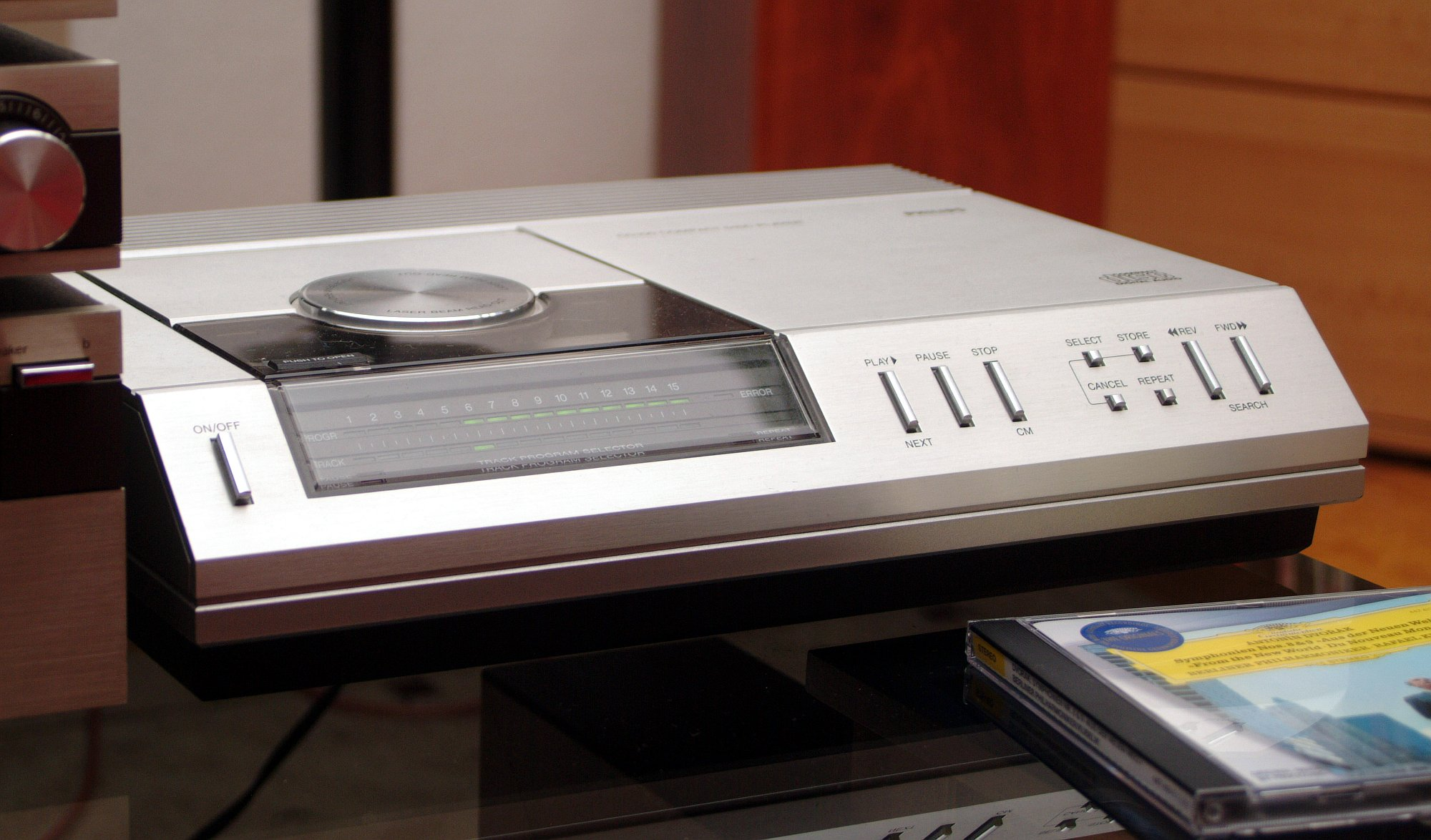
Philips CD-100, an early commercially released CD player

During the late 1970s and early 1980s, Philips and Sony cooperated to standardize and commercialize the compact disc. Philips and Sony jointly developed the format, with the first commercial CD products appearing in 1982 and 1983.

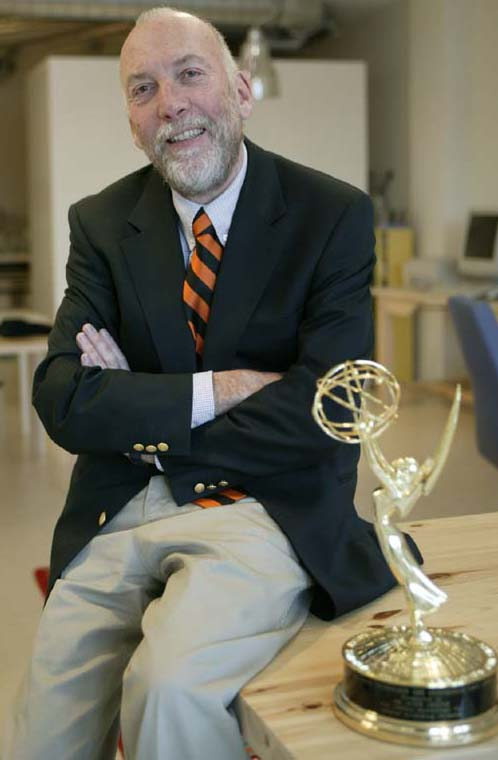
Kees Schouhamer Immink, a Philips researcher whose work contributed to coding technology used for the compact disc

Philips researcher Kees Schouhamer Immink developed the eight-to-fourteen modulation coding system adopted for the compact-disc standard.

=== Semiconductors and restructuring ===
In 1984, Philips and ASM International established ASM Lithography, later ASML, as a joint venture to commercialize wafer-stepper technology developed at Philips. The venture began operations on 1 April 1984.

In 1987, TSMC was founded as a joint venture among the government of the Republic of China, Philips and other private investors.

During the late 1980s and early 1990s, Philips underwent major restructuring following heavy losses caused by over-expansion and tough competition. In 1990, under chief executive Jan Timmer, the company announced plans to cut about 10,000 jobs as part of a broad cost-reduction program.

In 1991, Digital Equipment Corporation agreed to acquire most of Philips' computer-systems division, including its minicomputer, networking and automated-teller-machine activities.

The legal name of the parent company changed from N.V. Philips' Gloeilampenfabrieken to Philips Electronics N.V. on 6 May 1994, to Koninklijke Philips Electronics N.V. on 1 April 1998, and to Koninklijke Philips N.V. on 15 May 2013.

In October 1997, the company's board decided to relocate the corporate headquarters from Eindhoven to Amsterdam. The relocation began in 1998.

Philips' "Sense and Simplicity" slogan, introduced in 2004

In 2006, Philips separated its semiconductor activities. On 29 September 2006, it completed the sale of an 80.1% stake in its semiconductor business to a private-equity consortium consisting of Kohlberg Kravis Roberts & Co., Silver Lake Partners, Bain Capital, Apax Partners and AlpInvest Partners. The semiconductor company became NXP Semiconductors, while Philips initially retained a minority interest.

=== Shift to health technology ===
During the 2010s, Philips progressively reduced its involvement in several traditional consumer-electronics businesses and concentrated more heavily on health technology.

In April 2012, Philips completed the transfer of most of its television business to TP Vision, a joint venture initially owned 70% by TPV Technology and 30% by Philips.

Philips separated its lighting business in 2016. The independent company, Philips Lighting N.V., changed its name to Signify N.V. in May 2018 and continued to use the Philips brand for lighting products under a licensing agreement.

In September 2021, Philips completed the sale of its Domestic Appliances business to Hillhouse Investment. The transaction included a long-term licensing agreement allowing the independent company to continue using the Philips brand. In February 2023, the independent business adopted the name Versuni.

Roy Jakobs succeeded Frans van Houten as president and chief executive officer on 15 October 2022.

In January 2023, amid losses and difficulties associated with the Philips Respironics recall, Philips announced an additional 6,000 job cuts worldwide over two years, on top of 4,000 reductions announced in 2022.

By 2025, Philips reported three main business segments: Diagnosis & Treatment, Connected Care and Personal Health.

On 15 January 2026, Philips completed its acquisition of SpectraWAVE, a United States-based developer of coronary intravascular imaging and physiological-assessment technology. Philips included the acquired business in its Diagnosis & Treatment segment.

== Corporate affairs ==
=== CEOs ===
Past and present CEOs:

- 1891–1922: Gerard Philips
- 1922–1939: Anton Philips
- 1939–1961: Frans Otten
- 1961–1971: Frits Philips
- 1971–1977: Henk van Riemsdijk
- 1977–1981: Nico Rodenburg
- 1982–1986: Wisse Dekker
- 1986–1990: Cor van der Klugt
- 1990–1996: Jan Timmer
- 1996–2001: Cor Boonstra
- 2001–2011: Gerard Kleisterlee
- 2011–2022: Frans van Houten
- 2022–present: Roy Jakobs

CEOs lighting:

- 2003–2008: Theo van Deursen
- 2012–2016: Eric Rondolat

=== CFOs ===
Past and present CFOs (chief financial officer)

- 1960–1968: Cor Dillen
- –1997: Dudley Eustace
- 1997–2005: Jan Hommen
- 2008-2015: Ron Wirahadiraksa
- 2015–2024: Abhijit Bhattacharya
- 2024–present: Charlotte Hanneman

=== Executive committee ===
- CEO: Roy Jakobs
- CFO: Charlotte Hanneman
- COO: Willem Appelo
- Chief ESG & Legal Officer: Marnix van Ginneken
- Chief Patient Safety & Quality Officer: Steve C da Baca
- Chief Business Leader (Connected Care): Julia Strandberg
- Chief Business Leader (Personal Health): Deeptha Khanna
- Chief Business Leader (Image Guided Therapy): Bert van Meurs
- Chief Business Leader (Precision Diagnosis): Jie Xue
- Chief of International Region: Özlem Fidanci
- Chief Innovation & Strategy Officer and Chief Business Leader of Enterprise Informatics: Shez Partovi
- Chief Region Leader (Greater China): Ling Liu
- Chief Region Leader (North America): Jeff DiLullo
- Chief People Officer: Heidi Sichien

=== Acquisitions ===
Companies acquired by Philips through the years include ADAC Laboratories, Agilent Healthcare Solutions Group, Amperex, ATL Ultrasound, EKCO, Lifeline Systems, Magnavox, Marconi Medical Systems, Mullard, Optiva, Preethi, Pye, Respironics, Inc., Sectra Mamea AB, Signetics, Teletrol, VISICU, Volcano, VLSI, Ximis, portions of Westinghouse and the consumer electronics operations of Philco and Sylvania. Philips abandoned the Sylvania trademark, which is now owned by Havells Sylvania, except in Australia, Canada, Mexico, New Zealand, and Puerto Rico and the rest of the US, where it is owned by Osram. Formed in November 1999 as an equal joint venture between Philips and Agilent Technologies, the light-emitting diode manufacturer Lumileds became a subsidiary of Philips Lighting in August 2005 and a fully owned subsidiary in December 2006. An 80.1 percent stake in Lumileds was sold to Apollo Global Management in 2017.

On 18 July 2017, Philips announced its acquisition of TomTec Imaging Systems GmbH On 19 September 2018, Philips reported that it had acquired Canada-based Blue Willow Systems, a developer of a cloud-based senior living community resident safety platform.

On 7 March 2019, Philips announced that it was acquiring the Healthcare Information Systems business of Carestream Health Inc., a US-based provider of medical imaging and healthcare IT solutions for hospitals, imaging centers, and specialty medical clinics.

On 18 July 2019, Philips announced that it has expanded its patient management solutions in the US with the acquisition of Boston-based start-up company Medumo. On 27 August 2020, Philips announced the acquisition of Intact Vascular, Inc., a US-based developer of medical devices for minimally invasive peripheral vascular procedures. On 18 December 2020, Philips and BioTelemetry, Inc., a leading US-based provider of remote cardiac diagnostics and monitoring, announced that they had entered into a definitive merger agreement.

On 19 January 2021, Philips announced the acquisition of Capsule Technologies, Inc., a provider of medical device integration and data technologies for hospitals and healthcare organizations. On 9 November 2021, Philips announced the acquisition of Cardiologs, an AI-powered cardiac diagnostic technology developer, to expand its cardiac diagnostics and monitoring portfolio.

== Operations ==
Philips is registered in the Netherlands as a naamloze vennootschap (public corporation) and has its global headquarters in Amsterdam. At the end of 2013, Philips had 111 manufacturing facilities, 59 R&D facilities across 26 countries, and sales and service operations in around 100 countries.

Philips is organized into three main divisions: Philips Consumer Lifestyle (formerly Philips Consumer Electronics and Philips Domestic Appliances and Personal Care), Philips Healthcare (formerly Philips Medical Systems), and Philips Lighting (former). Philips achieved total revenues of €22.579 billion in 2011, of which €8.852 billion were generated by Philips Healthcare, €7.638 billion by Philips Lighting, €5.823 billion by Philips Consumer Lifestyle, and €266 million from group activities. At the end of 2011, Philips had a total of 121,888 employees, of whom around 44% were employed in Philips Lighting, 31% in Philips Healthcare and 15% in Philips Consumer Lifestyle. The lighting division was spun out as a new company called Signify, which uses the Philips brand under license.

Philips invested a total of €1.61 billion in research and development in 2011, equivalent to 7.10% of sales. Philips Intellectual Property and Standards is the group-wide division responsible for licensing, trademark protection and patenting. Philips holds around 54,000 patent rights, 39,000 trademarks, 70,000 design rights and 4,400 domain name registrations. In the 2024 review of WIPO's annual World Intellectual Property Indicators Philips ranked 7th in the world for its 294 industrial design registrations being published under the Hague System during 2023.

=== Asia ===
==== Thailand ====
Philips Thailand was established in 1952. It is a subsidiary that produces healthcare, lifestyle, and lighting products. Philips started manufacturing in Thailand in 1960 with an incandescent lamp factory. Philips has diversified its production facilities to include a fluorescent lamp factory and a luminaries factory, serving Thai and worldwide markets.

==== Hong Kong ====
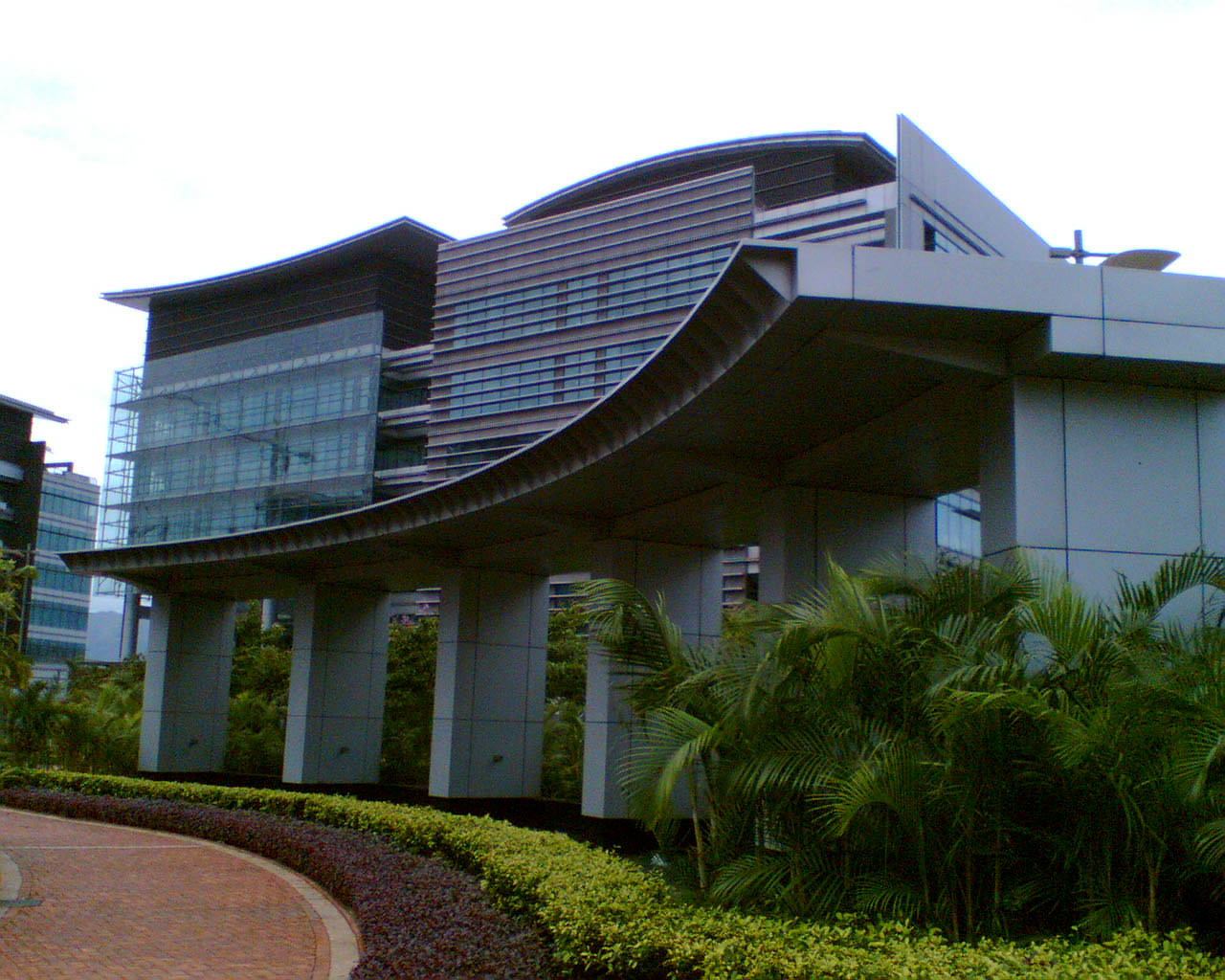
The Philips building in the Hong Kong Science Park, August 2006

Philips Hong Kong began operations in 1948. Philips Hong Kong houses the global headquarters of Philips' Audio Business Unit. It also house Philips' Asia Pacific regional office and headquarters for its Design Division, Domestic Appliances & Personal Care Products Division, Lighting Products Division and Medical System Products Division.

In 1974, Philips opened a lamp factory in Hong Kong. This has a capacity of 200 million pieces a year and is certified with ISO 9001:2000 and ISO 14001. Its product portfolio includes prefocus, lensend and E10 miniature light bulbs.

==== China ====
Philips established its first 50/50 joint venture company Beijing Philips Audio/Video Corporation (北京飞利浦有限公司) with Beijing Radio Factory (北京无线电厂) to manufacture audio consumer electronic products in Beijing in 1987. In 1990, a factory was set up in Zhuhai, Guangdong, mainly manufactures Philishaves and healthcare products. In early 2008, Philips Lighting, a division of Royal Philips Electronics, opened a small engineering center in Shanghai to adapt the company's products to vehicles in Asia. Today, Philips has 27 WOFE/JVs in China, employing more than 17,500 people. China is its second-largest market.

==== India ====
Philips began operations in India in 1930, with the establishment of Philips Electrical Co. (India) Pvt Ltd in Kolkata (then Calcutta) as a sales outlet for imported Philips lamps. In 1938, Philips established its first Indian lamp manufacturing factory in Kolkata. In 1948, Philips began manufacturing radios in Kolkata. In 1959, a second radio factory was established near Pune. This was closed and sold around 2006. In 1957, the company converted into a public limited company, renamed "Philips India Ltd". In 1970, a new consumer electronics factory began operations in Pimpri near Pune. Also, a manufacturing facility was started in Chakan, Pune in 2012. In 1996, the Philips Software Centre was established in Bangalore, later renamed the Philips Innovation Campus. In 2008, Philips India entered the water purifier market. In 2014, Philips was ranked 12th among India's most-trusted brands according to the Brand Trust Report, a study conducted by Trust Research Advisory. Now Philips India is one of the most diversified health care companies and focuses on imaging, sleep and respiratory care products, ultrasound, monitoring and analytics items, as well as therapeutic care products. In 2020, Philips introduced mobile ICUs in order to support clinicians to meet the rising demand of ICU beds due to the COVID-19 pandemic.

==== Israel ====
Philips has been active in Israel since 1948 and in 1998, set up a wholly owned subsidiary, Philips Electronics (Israel) Ltd. The company has over 700 employees in Israel and generated sales of over $300 million in 2007.

Philips Medical Systems Technologies Ltd. (Haifa) is a developer and manufacturer of computerized tomography (CT), diagnostic and medical imaging systems. The company was founded in 1969 as Elscint by Elron Electronic Industries and was acquired by Marconi Medical Systems in 1998, which was itself acquired by Philips in 2001. Philips Semiconductors formerly had major operations in Israel; these now form part of NXP Semiconductors.

On 1 August 2019, Philips acquired Carestream HCIS division from Onex Corporation. As part of the acquisition, Algotec Systems LTD (Carestream HCIS R&D) located in Raanana Israel changed ownership in a share deal. In addition to that, Algotec changed its name to Philips Algotec and is part of Philips HCIS. Philips HCIS is a provider of medical imaging systems.

==== Pakistan ====
Philips has been active in Pakistan since 1948 and has a wholly owned subsidiary, Philips Pakistan Limited (Formerly Philips Electrical Industries of Pakistan Limited). The head office is in Karachi with regional sales offices in Lahore and Rawalpindi.

==== Singapore ====
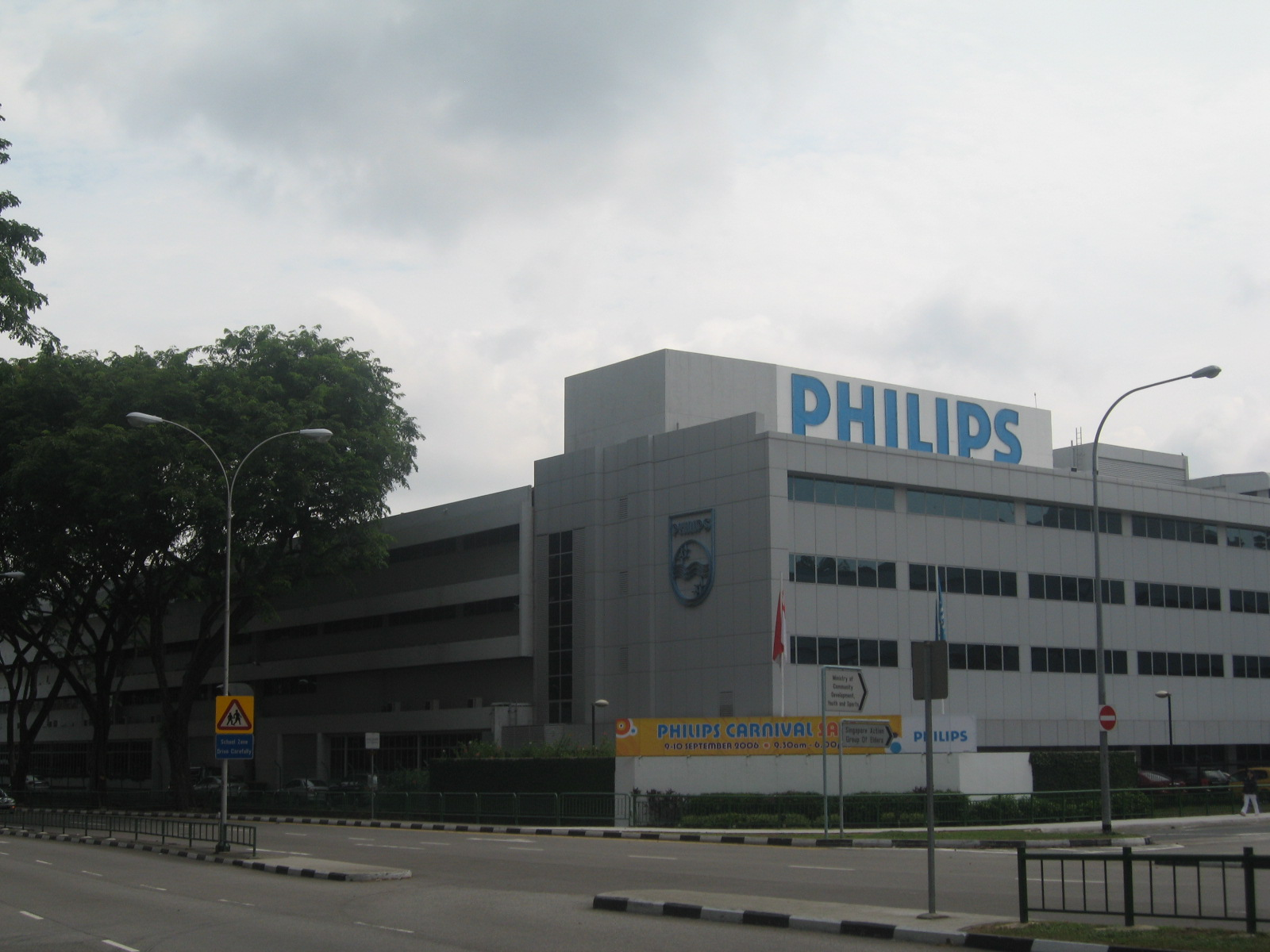
A part of the former Philips Singapore HQ complex at Toa Payoh in September 2006; the new Philips APAC HQ was opened on the site of this particular building in June 2016

Philips began operations in Singapore in 1951, initially as a local distributor of imported Philips products. Philips later established manufacturing sites at Boon Keng Road and Jurong Industrial Estate in 1968 and 1970 respectively. Since 1972, its regional headquarters has been based in the central HDB town of Toa Payoh, which from the 1990s until the early 2010s consisted of four interconnected buildings housing offices and factory spaces. In 2016, a new Philips APAC HQ building was opened on the site of one of the former 1972 buildings.

=== Europe ===
==== Denmark ====
Philips Denmark was founded in Copenhagen in 1927, and is now headquartered in Frederiksberg.

In 1963, Philips established the Philips TV & Test Equipment laboratory in Amager (moved to Brøndby Municipality in 1989) which was where engineers Erik Helmer Nielsen and Finn Hendil (1939–2011) created and developed some of Philips' most iconic television test cards, such as the monochrome PM5540 and the colour PM5544 and TVE test cards. In 1998 Philips TV & Test Equipment was spun off as ProTeleVision Technologies A/S and sold to PANTA Electronics B.V. which was owned by a consortium of investors led by Advent International. ProTeleVision Technologies A/S was dissolved in 2001 with products transferring to ProTelevision Technologies Corp A/S, DK-Audio A/S (dissolved 2018) and AREPA Test & Calibration.

==== France ====
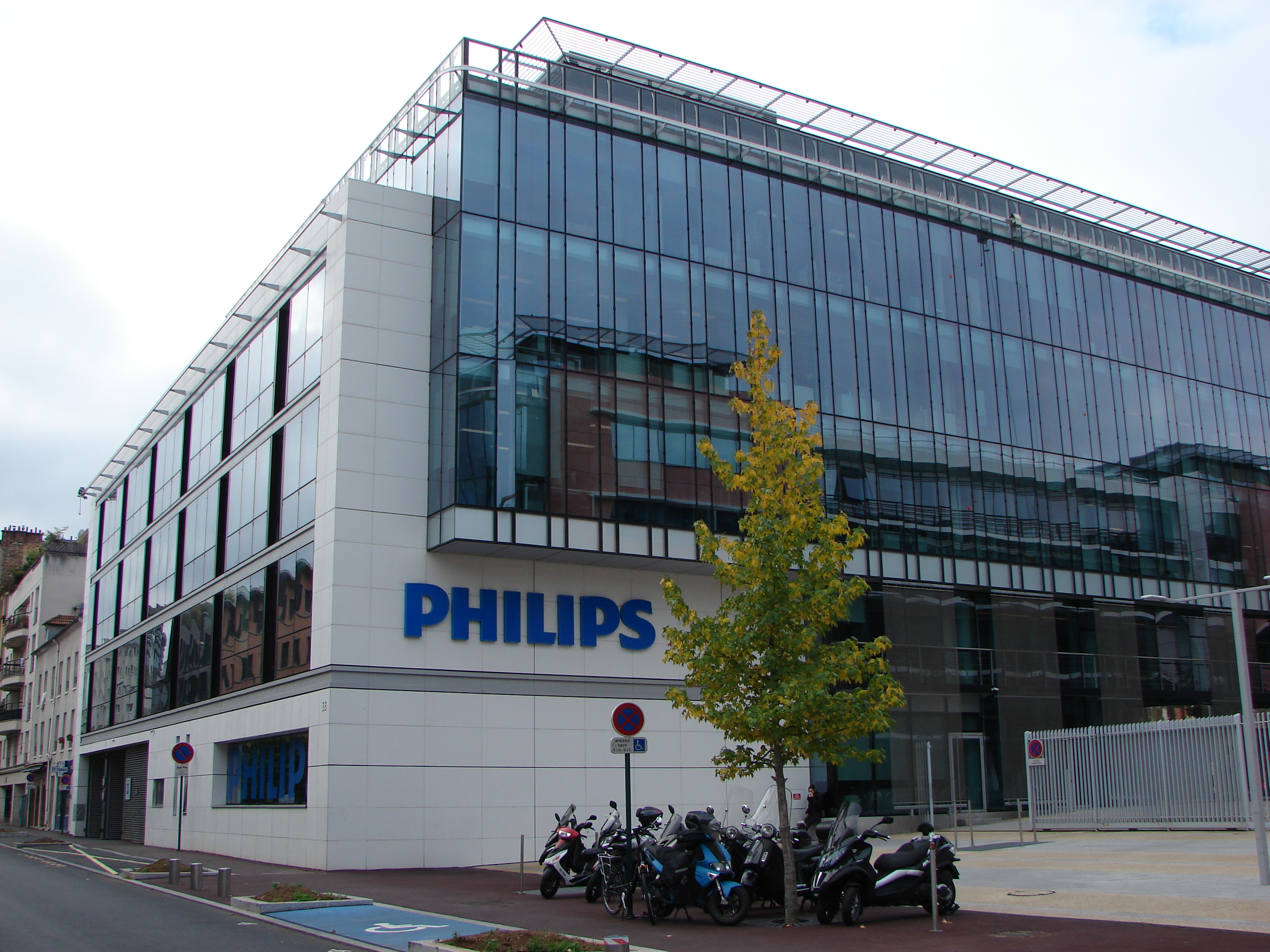
The headquarters of Philips France in Suresnes west of Paris, October 2011

Philips France has its headquarters in Suresnes. The company employs over 3600 people nationwide.

Philips Lighting has manufacturing facilities in Chalon-sur-Saône (fluorescent lamps), Chartres (automotive lighting), Lamotte-Beuvron (architectural lighting by LEDs and professional indoor lighting), Longvic (lamps), Miribel (outdoor lighting), Nevers (professional indoor lighting). All manufacturing in France were sold or discontinued before the Lighting spin-off in 2016.

==== Germany ====
Philips Germany was founded in 1926 in Berlin. Now its headquarters is located in Hamburg. Over 4900 people are employed in Germany.

- Hamburg
  - Distribution center of the divisions Healthcare, Consumer Lifestyle, and Lighting
  - Philips Medical Systems DMC
  - Philips Innovative Technologies, Research Laboratories
- Aachen
  - Philips Innovative Technologies
  - Philips Innovation Services
- Böblingen
  - Philips Medical Systems, patient monitoring systems
- Herrsching
  - Philips Respironics
- Ulm
  - Philips Photonics, development and manufacture of vertical laser diodes (VCSELs) and photodiodes for sensing and data communication

==== Greece ====
Philips' Greece is headquartered in Chalandri in Attica. As of 2012, Philips has no manufacturing plants in Greece, although previously there were audio, lighting and telecommunications factories.

==== Italy ====
Philips founded its Italian subsidiary in 1923, basing it in Milan where it still operates. After the closure of the company's industrial operations, mainly manufacturing TVs in Monza and conventional light bulbs near Turin, Philips Italia exists for commercial activities only.

==== Hungary ====
Philips founded PACH (Philips Assembly Centre Hungary) in 1992, producing televisions and consumer electronics in Székesfehérvár. After TPV entering the Philips TV business, the factory was moved under TP Vision, the new joint-venture company in 2011. Products have been transferred to Poland and China and factory was closed in 2013.

By Philips acquiring PLI in 2007, another Hungarian Philips factory emerged in Tamási, producing lamps under the name of Philips IPSC Tamási, later Philips Lighting. The factory was renamed to Signify in 2017, still producing Philips lighting products.

==== Poland ====
Philips' operations in Poland include: a European financial and accounting centre in Łódź; Philips Lighting facilities in Bielsko-Biała, Piła, and Kętrzyn; and a Philips Domestic Appliances facility in Białystok.

==== Portugal ====
Philips started business in Portugal in 1927, as "Philips Portuguesa S.A.R.L.". Philips Portuguesa S.A. is headquartered in Oeiras near Lisbon. There were three Philips factories in Portugal: the FAPAE lamp factory in Lisbon; the Carnaxide magnetic-core memory factory near Lisbon, where the Philips Service organization was also based; and the Ovar factory in northern Portugal making camera components and remote control devices. The company still operates in Portugal with divisions for commercial lighting, medical systems and domestic appliances.

==== Sweden ====
Philips Sweden has two main sites: Kista, Stockholm County, with regional sales, marketing and a customer support organization; and Solna, Stockholm County, with the main office of the mammography division.

The company was a major supplier of defence electronics to the Swedish Armed Forces operating under the name Philips Elektronikindustrier AB with its final location in Järfälla, a suburb of Stockholm. What remains of that division is now part of Saab AB.

==== United Kingdom ====
Philips UK has its headquarters in Farnborough, Hampshire. The company employs over 2,500 people nationwide.

- Philips Healthcare Informatics, Belfast develops healthcare software products.
- Philips Consumer Products, Guildford provides sales and marketing for televisions, including High Definition televisions, DVD recorders, hi-fi and portable audio, CD recorders, PC peripherals, cordless telephones, home and kitchen appliances, and personal care products (shavers, hair dryers, body beauty, and oral hygiene ).
- Philips Dictation Systems, Colchester
- Philips Lighting: sales from Guildford and manufactured in Hamilton
- Philips Healthcare, Guildford; sales and technical support for X-ray, ultrasound, nuclear medicine, patient monitoring, magnetic resonance, computed tomography, and resuscitation products
- Philips Research Laboratories, Cambridge (until 2008 based in Redhill, Surrey; originally it was called the Mullard Research Laboratories).

In the past, Philips UK also included:

- Consumer product manufacturing in Croydon
- Television Tube Manufacturing Mullard Simonstone
- Philips Business Communications, Cambridge: offered voice and data communications products, specializing in Customer Relationship Management (CRM) applications, IP Telephony, data networking, voice processing, command and control systems and cordless and mobile telephony. In 2006 the business was placed into a 60/40 joint venture with NEC. NEC later acquired 100 per cent ownership and the business was renamed NEC Unified Solutions
- Philips Electronics Blackburn; vacuum tubes, capacitors, delay-lines, Laserdiscs, CDs
- Philips Domestic Appliances Hastings: Design and Production of Electric kettles, Fan Heaters plus former EKCO brand "Thermotube" Tubular Heaters and "Hostess" Domestic Food Warming Trolleys
- Mullard Southampton and Hazel Grove, Stockport was originally brought together as a joint venture between Mullard and GEC as Associated Semiconductor Manufacturers. They developed and manufactured rectifiers, diodes, transistors, integrated circuits, and electro-optical devices. It became Philips Semiconductors before becoming part of NXP.
- London Carriers, logistics and transport division
- Mullard Equipment Limited (MEL) which produced products for the military
- Ada (Halifax) Ltd, maker of washing machines and spin driers, refrigerators
- Pye TVT Ltd of Cambridge
- Pye Telecommunications Ltd of Cambridge
- TMC Limited of Malmesbury

=== North America ===
==== Canada ====
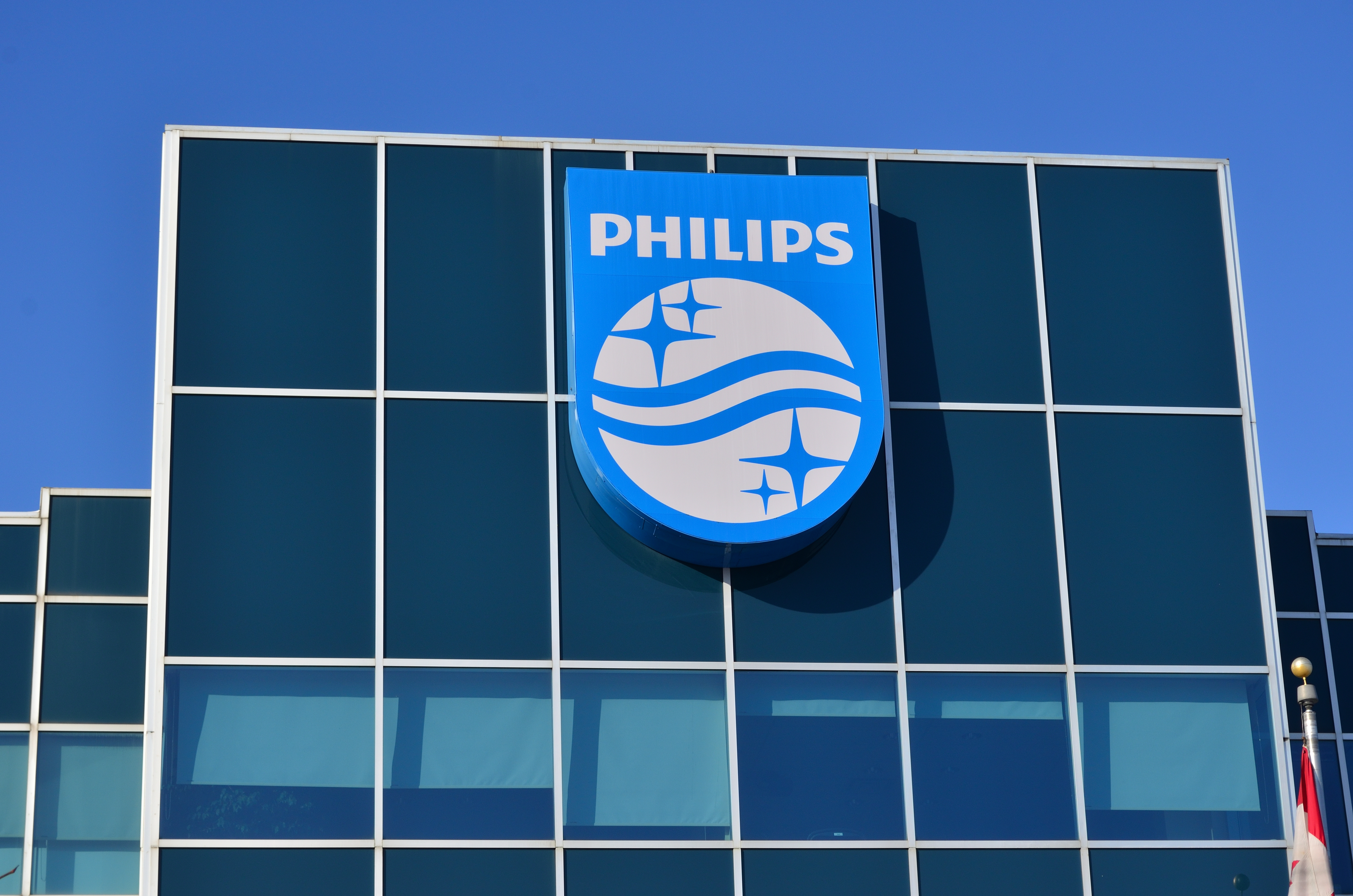
Philips headquarters in Markham, February 2020

Philips Canada was founded in 1941 when it acquired Small Electric Motors Limited. It is well known in medical systems for diagnosis and therapy, lighting technologies, shavers, and consumer electronics. The Canadian headquarters are located in Markham, Ontario.

For several years, Philips manufactured lighting products in two Canadian factories. The London, Ontario, plant opened in 1971. It produced A19 lamps (including the "Royale" long life bulbs), PAR38 lamps and T19 lamps (originally a Westinghouse lamp shape). Philips closed the factory in May 2003. The Trois-Rivières, Quebec, plant was a Westinghouse facility which Philips continued to run it after buying Westinghouse's lamp division in 1983. Philips closed this factory a few years later, in the late 1980s.

==== Mexico ====
Philips Mexico Commercial SA de CV is headquartered in Mexico City. This entity was incorporated in FY 2016 to sales consumer lifestyle and healthcare portfolios in the market.

==== United States ====
Philips branding campaign, 1987

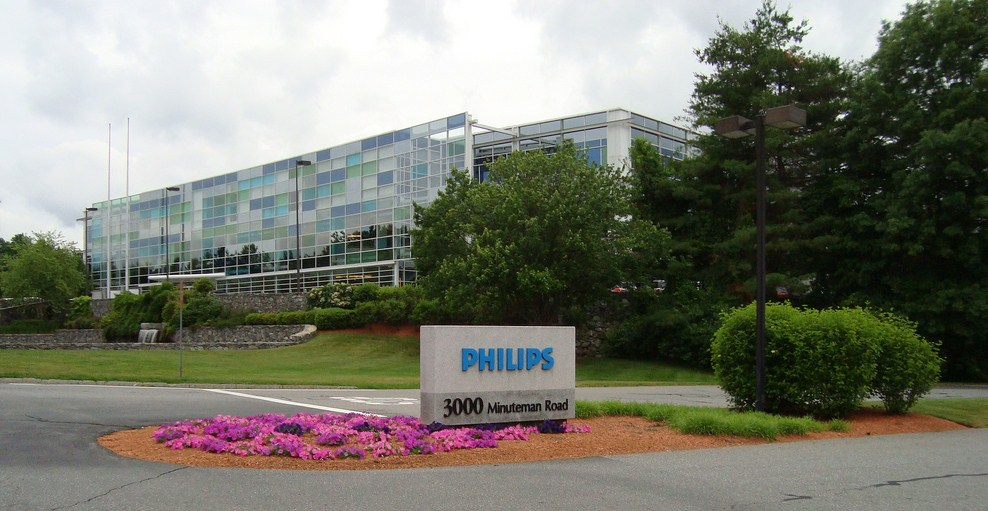
Previous Philips' North American headquarters in Andover, Massachusetts, June 2009

Philips' Electronics North American headquarters is in Cambridge, Massachusetts. Philips Lighting has its corporate office in Somerset, New Jersey; with manufacturing plants in Danville, Kentucky; Salina, Kansas; Dallas and Paris, Texas; and distribution centers in Mountain Top, Pennsylvania; El Paso, Texas; Ontario, California; and Memphis, Tennessee. Philips Healthcare is headquartered in Cambridge, Massachusetts, and operates a health-tech hub in Nashville with over 1,000 jobs. The North American sales organization is based in Bothell, Washington. There are also manufacturing facilities in Bothell, Washington; Baltimore, Maryland; Cleveland, Ohio; Foster City, California; Gainesville, Florida; Milpitas, California; and Reedsville, Pennsylvania. Philips Healthcare formerly had a factory in Knoxville, Tennessee. Philips Consumer Lifestyle has its corporate office in Stamford, Connecticut. Philips Lighting has a Color Kinetics office in Burlington, Massachusetts. Philips Research North American headquarters is in Cambridge.

From the early 1940s, Philco was legally able to prevent Philips from using the name "Philips" on any products marketed in the United States, because the two names were judged to sound similar enough to cause consumer confusion and potentially lead to claims of trademark infringement. This was made official and legally binding on January 19, 1943, when the court ruled in favor of the plaintiff in the corresponding case of Philco Corporation v. Philips Mfg. Co., that allowed Philco to prevent Philips from using its name on its products sold in the US. As a result, Philips instead used the name Norelco, an acronym for "North American Philips [electrical] Company". Philips continued to use that name for all their U.S. products until 1974, when Philips purchased The Magnavox Company. Philips then relabeled their U.S. consumer electronics products as Magnavox, but retained the Norelco name for their other U.S. products. When Philips bought Philco in 1981, Philips was able to freely use the Philips name for all of their U.S. products and renamed Magnavox Consumer Electronics to North American Philips Consumer Electronics, but they chose to retain the Norelco name for personal care appliances, and the Magnavox name for economy-priced consumer electronics.

By mid-1980s, the company used different brand names for its products in the United States - Magnavox, Sylvania, Philco, Norelco and even Philips - holding 10% of the American color television market, 9% of the compact-disk player market and 9% of the video cassette recorder market, selling VCRs made by Matsushita. In December 1986, Philips took direct control of its United States units - the North American Philips Company and the Signetics Corporation, which had been legally owned by a trust set up during World War II that was controlled by Philips. Philips tightened its operations and centralized its planning functions to prevent being "picked off piecemeal by the Japanese".

In 2007, Philips entered into a definitive merger agreement with the Genlyte Group, which provided the company with a leading position in the North American luminaires (also known as "lighting fixtures"), controls and related products for a wide variety of applications, including solid state lighting. The company also acquired Respironics, which was a significant gain for its healthcare sector. On 21 February 2008, Philips completed the acquisition of Baltimore-based VISICU. VISICU was the creator of the eICU concept of the use of Telemedicine from a centralized facility to monitor and care for ICU patients.

In April 2020, the United States Department of Health & Human Services (HHS) entered into a contract with Philips Respironics for 43,000 bundled Trilogy Evo Universal ventilator (EV300) hospital ventilators. This included the production and delivery of ventilators to the Strategic National Stockpile—about 156,000 by the end of August 2020 and 187,000 more by the end of 2020. During the COVID-19 pandemic, beginning in March 2020, in response to an international demand, Philips increased production of the ventilators fourfold within five months. Production lines were added in the United States with employees working around the clock in factories producing ventilators, in Western Pennsylvania and California, for example.

In March 2020, ProPublica published a series of articles on the Philips ventilator contract as negotiated by trade adviser Peter Navarro. In response to the ProPublica series, in August, the United States House of Representatives undertook a "congressional investigation" into the acquisition of the Philips ventilators. The lawmakers investigation found "evidence of fraud, waste and abuse".—the deal negotiated by Navarro had resulted in an over-payment to Philips by the US government of "hundreds of millions".

=== Oceania ===
==== Australia and New Zealand ====
Philips Australia was founded in 1927 and is headquartered in North Ryde, New South Wales; it also manages the New Zealand operation from there. The company employs about 800 people. Regional sales and support offices are located in Melbourne, Brisbane, Adelaide, Perth, and Auckland.

Activities include: Philips Healthcare (also responsible for New Zealand operations); Philips Lighting (also responsible for New Zealand operations); Philips Oral Healthcare, Philips Professional Dictation Solutions, Philips Professional Display Solutions, Philips AVENT Professional, Philips Consumer Lifestyle (also responsible for New Zealand operations); Philips Sleep & Respiratory Care (formerly Respironics), with its national network of Sleepeasy Centres; Philips Dynalite (Lighting Control systems, acquired in 2009, global design and manufacturing centre) and Philips Selecon NZ (Lighting Entertainment product design and manufacture).

=== South America ===
==== Brazil ====
Philips do Brasil was founded in 1924 in Rio de Janeiro. In 1929, Philips began selling radio receivers. In the 1930s, Philips was making its light bulbs and radio receivers in Brazil. From 1939 to 1945, World War II forced Brazilian branch of Philips to sell bicycles, refrigerators and insecticides. After the war, Philips had a great industrial expansion in Brazil, and was among the first groups to establish in Manaus Free Zone. In the 1970s, Philips Records was a major player in Brazil recording industry. Now Philips do Brasil is one of the largest foreign-owned companies in Brazil. Philips uses the brand Walita for domestic appliances in Brazil.

==== Color television ====
Color television was introduced in South America by Cor Dillen (CFO, 1960–1968; CEO, 1981–1982), with continent-wide service in the early 1980s.

=== Former operations ===
Philips subsidiary Philips-Duphar manufactured pharmaceuticals for human and veterinary use and products for crop protection. Duphar was sold to Solvay in 1990. Since then Solvay sold off all divisions to other companies (crop protection to UniRoyal, now Chemtura, the veterinary division to Fort Dodge, a division of Wyeth, and the pharmaceutical division to Abbott Laboratories).

PolyGram, Philips' music television and movies division, was sold to Seagram in 1998 and merged into Universal Music Group. Philips Records continues to operate as record label of UMG, its name is licensed from its former parent. In 1980, Philips acquired Marantz, a company renowned for high-end audio and video products, based at Kanagawa, Japan. In 2002, Marantz Japan merged with Denon to form D&M Holdings and Philips sold its remaining stake in D&M Holdings in 2008.

Origin, now part of Atos Origin, is a former division of Philips. ASM Lithography is a spin-off from a division of Philips. Hollandse Signaalapparaten was a manufacturer of military electronics. The business was sold to Thomson-CSF in 1990 and is now Thales Nederland. NXP Semiconductors, formerly known as Philips Semiconductors, was sold a consortium of private equity investors in 2006. On 6 August 2010, NXP completed its IPO, with shares trading on NASDAQ.

Ignis, of Comerio, in the province of Varese, Italy, producing washing machines, dishwashers and microwave ovens, was one of the leading companies in the domestic appliance market, holding a 38% share in 1960. In 1970, 50% of the company's capital was taken over by Philips, which acquired full control in 1972. Ignis was in those years, after Zanussi, the second largest domestic appliance manufacturer, and in 1973 its factories numbered over 10,000 employees only in Italy. With the transfer of ownership to the Dutch multinational, the corporate name of the company was changed, which became "IRE SpA" (Industrie Riunite Eurodomestici). Thereafter Philips used to sell major household appliances (whitegoods) under the name Philips. After selling the Major Domestic Appliances division to Whirlpool Corporation it changed from Philips Whirlpool to Whirlpool Philips and finally to just Whirlpool. Whirlpool bought a 53% stake in Philips' major appliance operations to form Whirlpool International. Whirlpool bought Philips' remaining interest in Whirlpool International in 1991.

Philips Cryogenics was split off in 1990 to form the Stirling Cryogenics BV, Netherlands. This company is still active in the development and manufacturing of Stirling cryocoolers and cryogenic cooling systems. North American Philips distributed AKG Acoustics products under the AKG of America, Philips Audio/Video, Norelco and AKG Acoustics Inc. branding until AKG set up its North American division in San Leandro, California, in 1985. (AKG's North American division has since moved to Northridge, California.)

Polymer Vision was a Philips spin-off which manufactured a flexible e-ink display screen. The company was acquired by Taiwanese contract electronics manufacturer Wistron in 2009 and it was shut down in 2012, after repeated failed attempts to find a potential buyer.

== Products ==
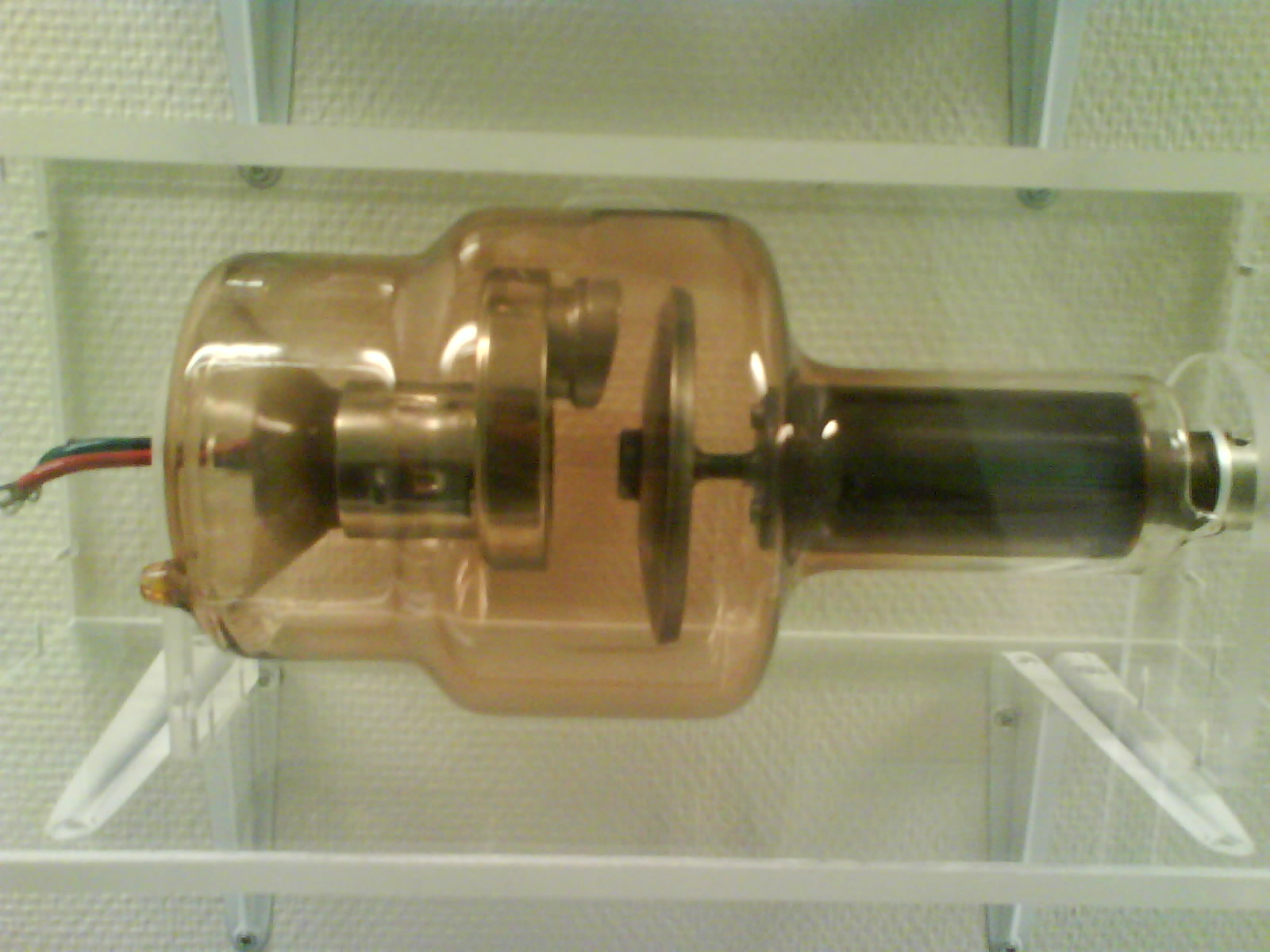
Old Philips x-ray tube

Philips' core products are personal health products including shavers, beauty appliances, mother and childcare appliances, electric toothbrushes and healthcare products (including CT scanners, ECG equipment, mammography equipment, monitoring equipment, MRI scanners, radiography equipment, resuscitation equipment, ultrasound equipment and X-ray equipment).

In January 2020 Philips announced that it wanted to sell its domestic appliances division, which includes products like coffee machines, air purifiers, and air fryers.

=== Lighting products ===
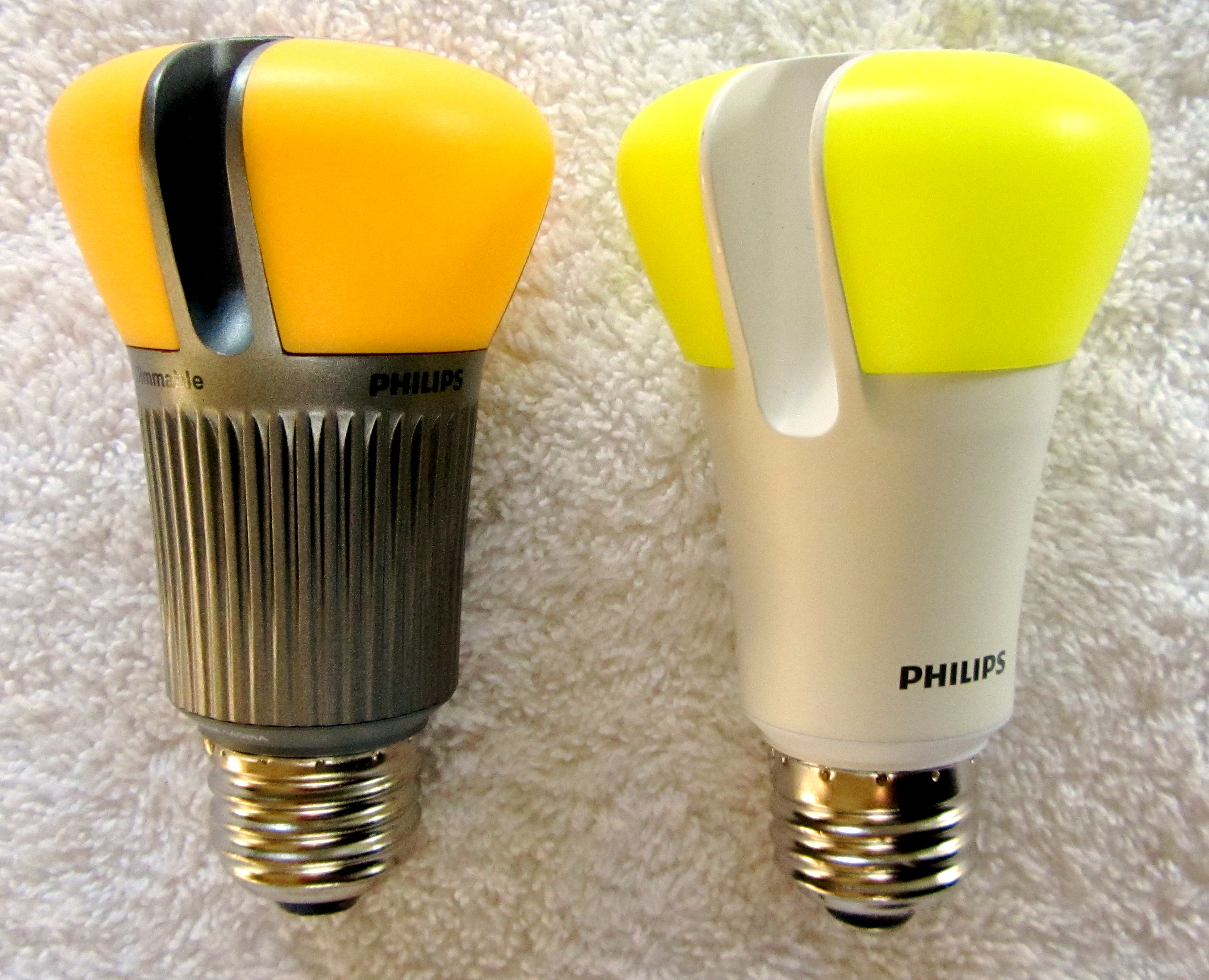
LED bulbs made by Philips

- Professional indoor luminaires
- Professional outdoor luminaires
- Professional lamps
- Lighting controls and control systems
- Digital projection lights
- Horticulture lighting
- Solar LED lights
- Smart office lighting systems
- Smart retail lighting systems
- Smart city lighting systems
- Home lamps
- Home fixtures
- Home systems (branded as Philips Hue)
- Automotive Lighting

=== Audio and Visual products ===
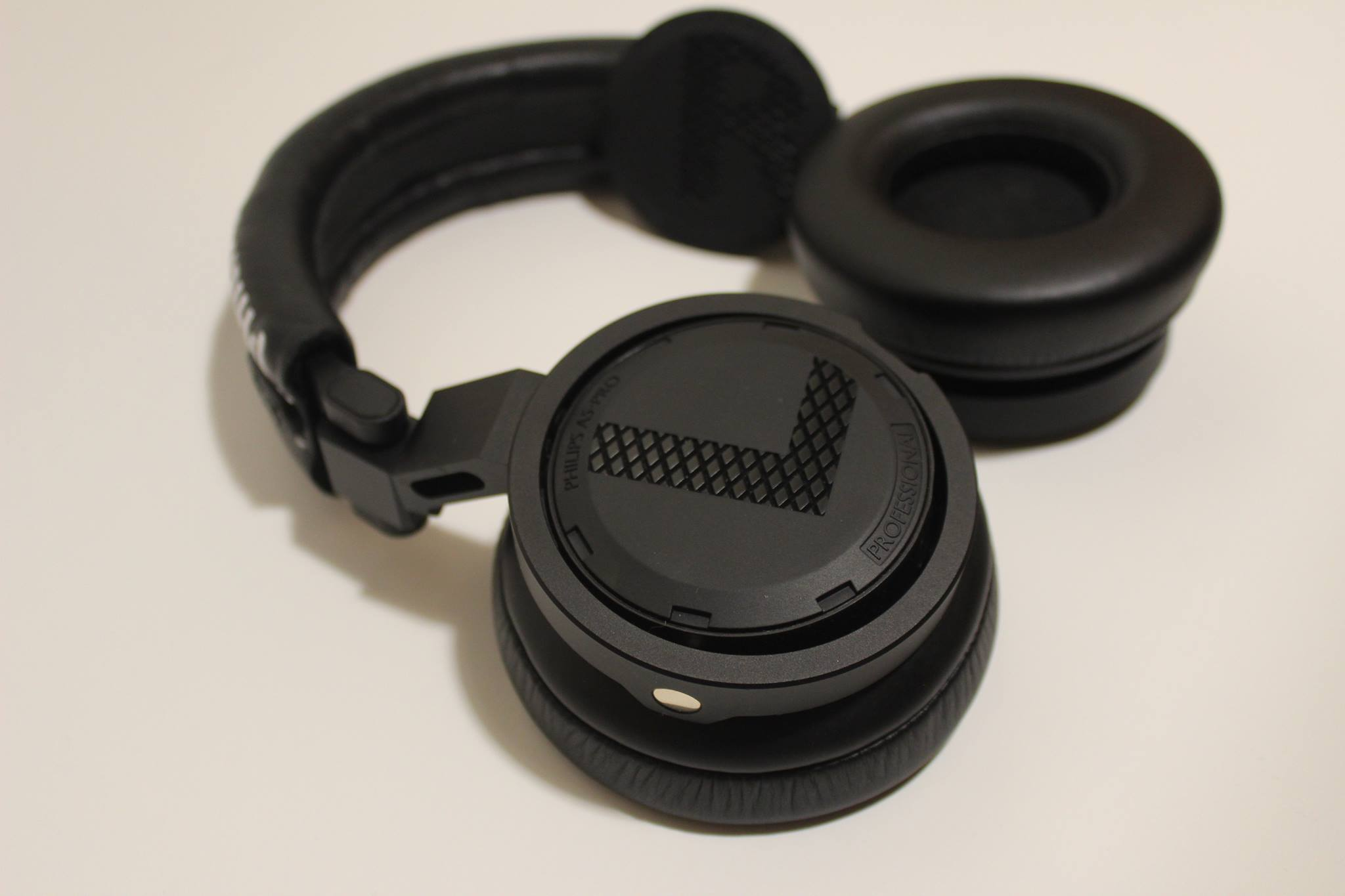
The Philips A5-PRO headphones

- Hi-fi systems
- Wireless speakers
- Radio systems
- Docking stations
- Headphones
- DJ mixers
- Alarm clocks
- TVs
- VCRs
- DVD players

=== Healthcare products ===
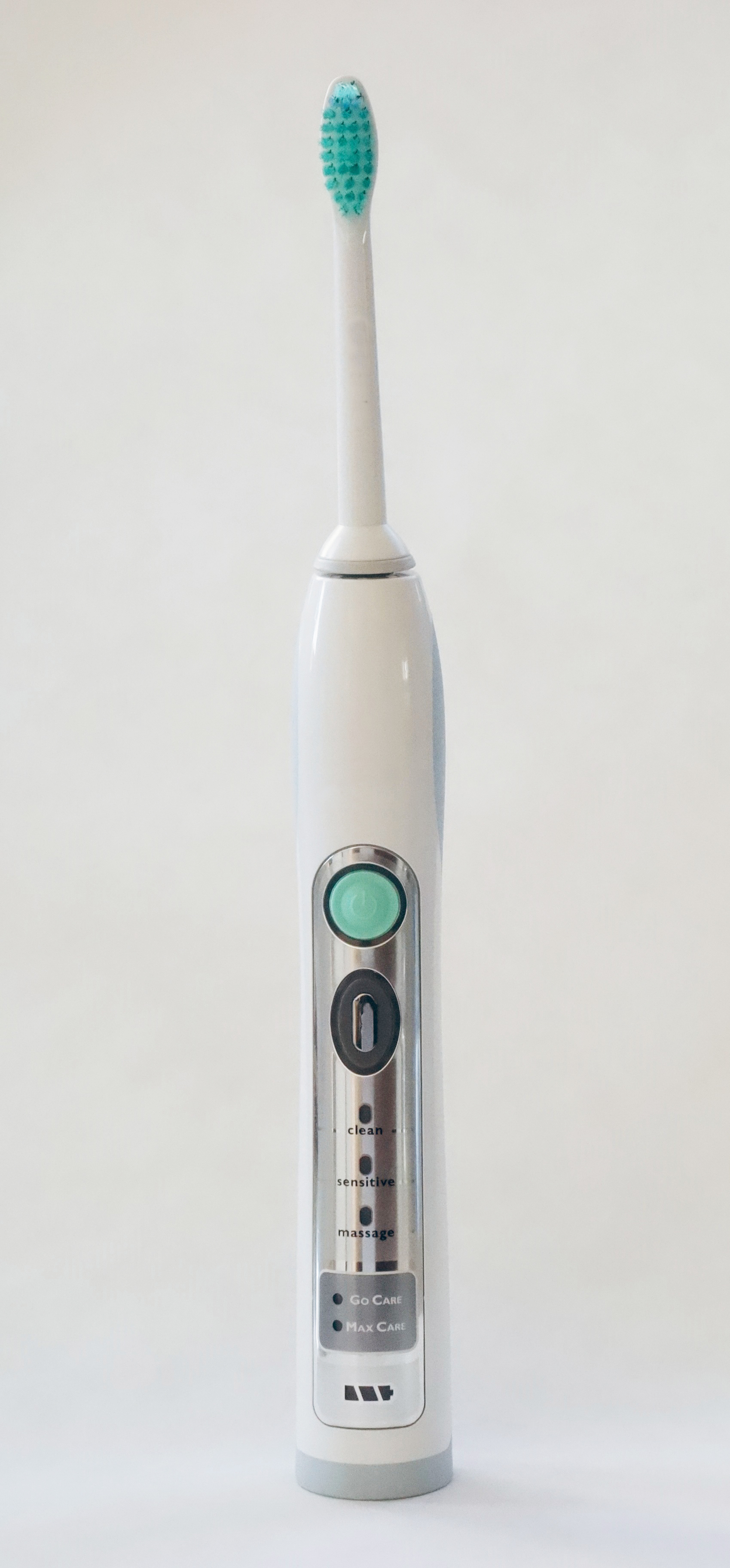
Sonicare electric toothbrush

Philips healthcare products include:

==== Clinical informatics ====
- Cardiology informatics (IntelliSpace Cardiovascular, Xcelera)
- Enterprise Imaging Informatics (IntelliSpace PACS, XIRIS)
- IntelliSpace family of solutions

==== Imaging systems ====
- Cardio/vascular X-ray wires and catheters (Verrata)
- Computed tomography (CT)
- Fluoroscopy
- Magnetic resonance imaging (MRI)
- Mammography
- Mobile C-Arms
- Nuclear medicine
- PET (Positron emission tomography)
- PET-CT
- Radiography
- Radiation oncology Systemsroots
- Ultrasound

==== Diagnostic monitoring ====
- Diagnostic ECG

==== Defibrillators ====
- Automated external defibrillators
- Portable monitor/defibrillators
- Accessories
- Equipment
- Software

==== Consumer ====
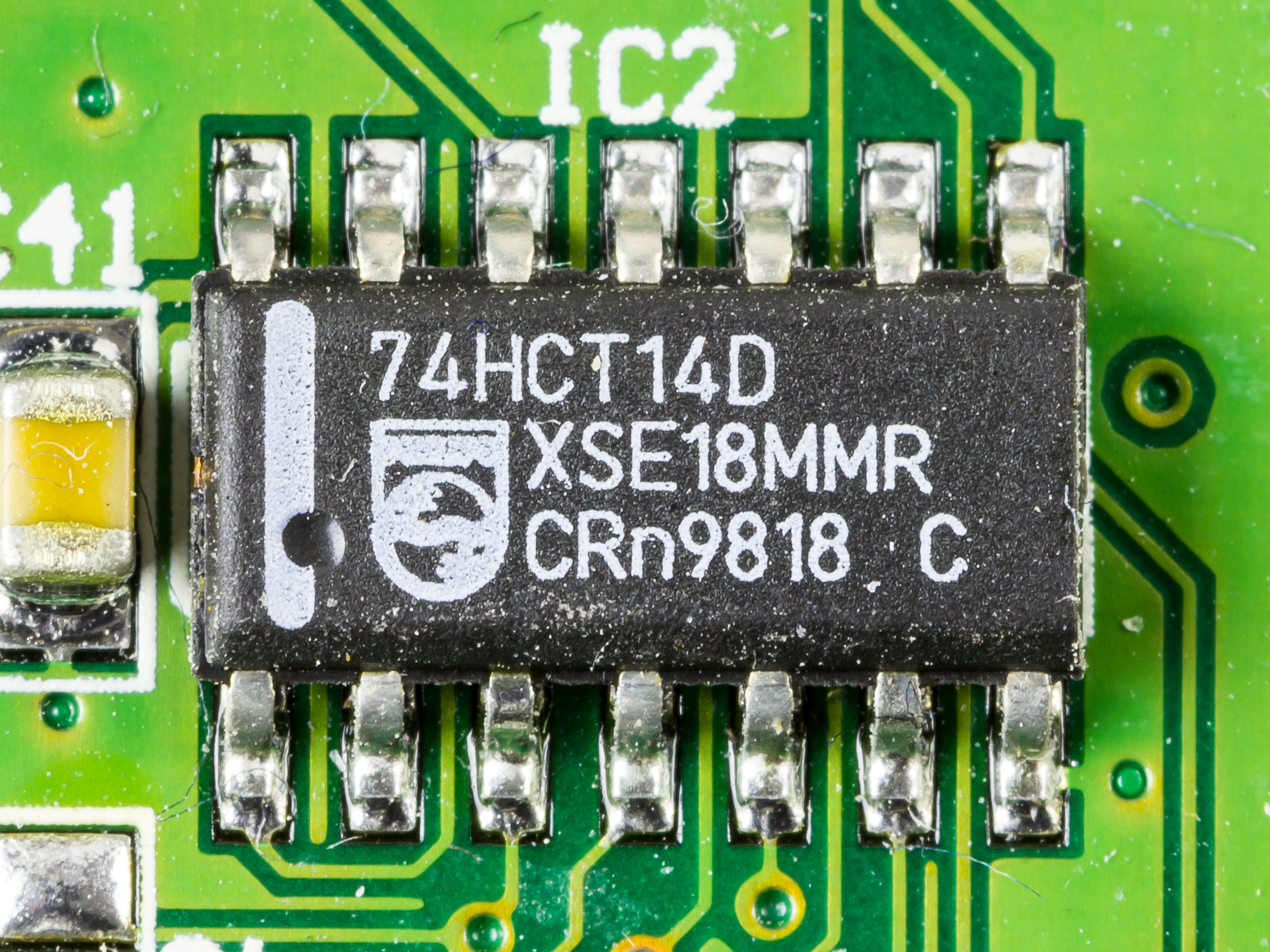
Philips Semiconductors schmitt trigger

- Philips AVENTil
- Philips Sonicare

==== Patient care and clinical informatics ====
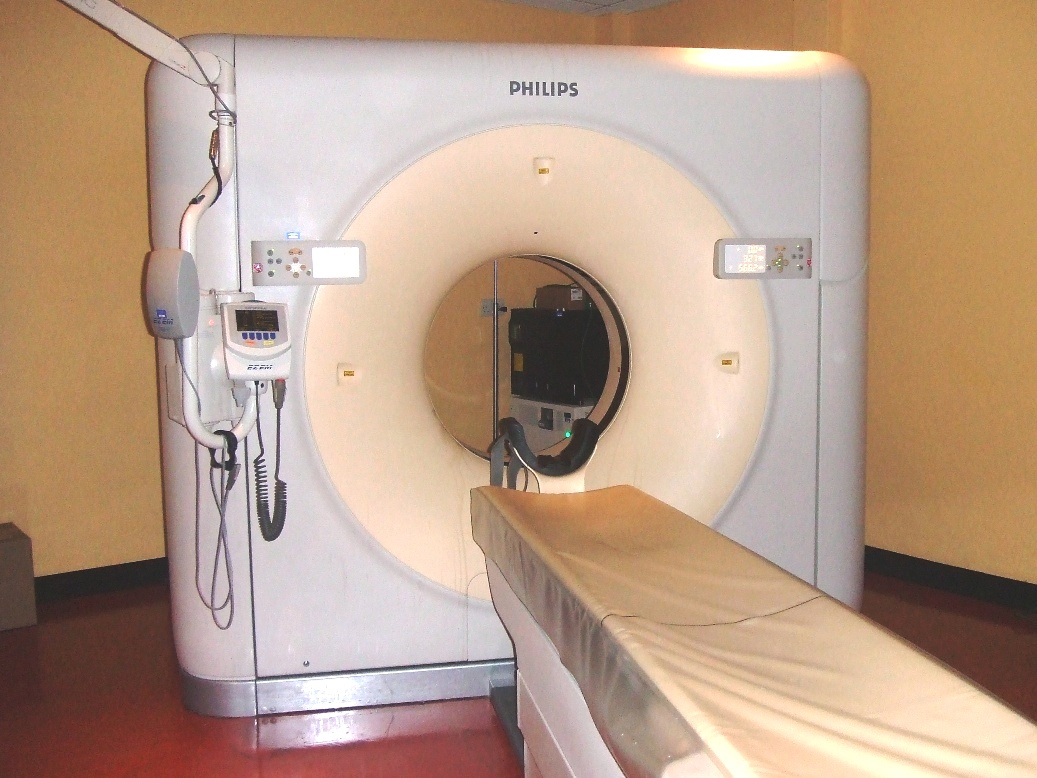
64-slice CT scanner originally developed by Elscint, now a Philips product

- Anesthetic gas monitoring
- Blood pressure
- Capnography
- D.M.E.
- Diagnostic sleep testing
- ECG
- Enterprise patient informatics solutions
  OB TraceVue
  Compurecord
  ICIP
  eICU program
  Emergin
- Hemodynamic
- IntelliSpace Cardiovascular
- IntelliSpace PACS
- IntelliSpace portal
- Multi-measurement servers
- Neurophedeoiles
- Pulse oximetry
- Tasy
- Temperature
- Transcutaneous gases
- Ventilation
- ViewForum
- Xcelera
- XIRIS
- Xper Information Management

In 2021, Philips acquired medical device company Capsule Technologies.

== Logo evolution ==
The Philips logo with the stars and waves was designed by Dutch architect Louis Kalff (1897–1976), who said that the emblem had been created as a coincidence as he did not know how a radio system worked.

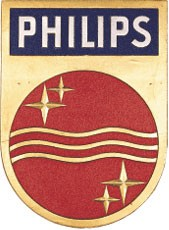
1938–59

1959–2008

2008–13

2013–present

Wordmark (1959–2008)

Wordmark (2008–present)

== Slogans ==
- Trust In Philips Is Worldwide (1960–1974)
- Simply Years Ahead (1974–1981)
- We Want You To Have The Best (1981–1985)
- Take a Closer Look (1985–1995)
- Let's Make Things Better (1995–2004)
- Sense & Simplicity (2004–2013)
- Innovation and You (2013–present)

== Sponsorships ==
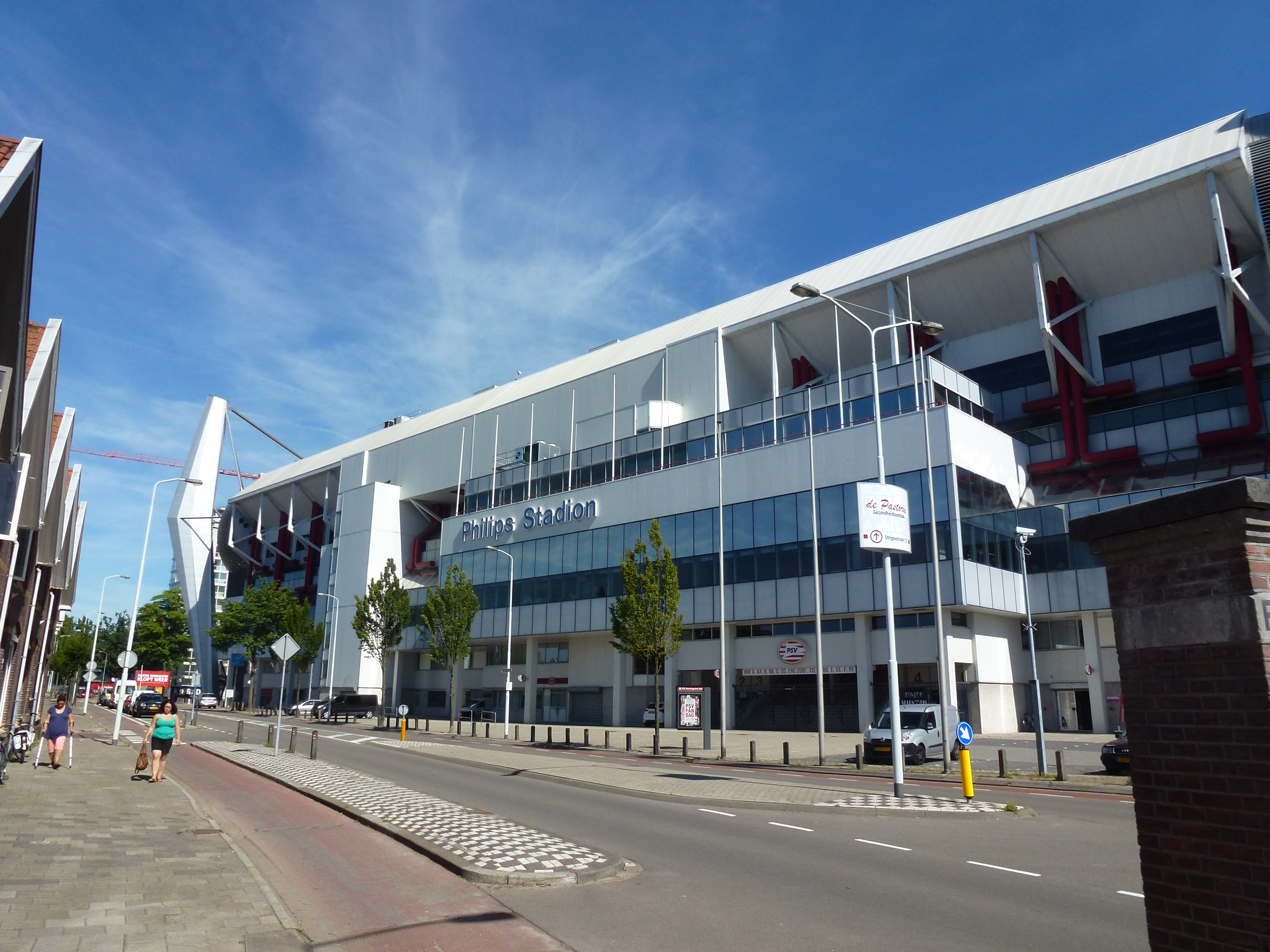
PSV's Philips Stadium, August 2012

In 1913, in celebration of the 100th anniversary of the liberation of the Netherlands, Philips founded Philips Sports Vereniging (Philips Sports Club, now commonly known as PSV). The club is active in numerous sports but is now best known for its football team, PSV Eindhoven, and swimming team. Philips owns the naming rights to Philips Stadium in Eindhoven, which is the home ground of PSV Eindhoven.

Outside of the Netherlands, Philips sponsors and has sponsored numerous sports clubs, sports facilities and events. In November 2008, Philips renewed and extended its F1 partnership with AT&T Williams. Philips owns the naming rights to the Philips Championship, the premier basketball league in Australia, traditionally known as the National Basketball League. From 1988 to 1993, Philips was the principal sponsor of the Australian rugby league team The Balmain Tigers and Indonesian football club side Persiba Balikpapan. From 1998 to 2000, Philips sponsored the Winston Cup No. 7 entry for Geoff Bodine Racing, later Ultra Motorsports, for drivers Geoff Bodine and Michael Waltrip. From 1999 to 2018, Philips held the naming rights to Philips Arena in Atlanta, home of the Atlanta Hawks of the National Basketball Association and former home of the defunct Atlanta Thrashers of the National Hockey League. In 2026, Philips became a sponsor for La Liga team El Real de Madrid

Outside of sports, Philips sponsored the Philips Monsters of Rock festival.

== Respironics recall ==
In June 2021, Philips announced a voluntary recall of several of its Respironics ventilators, BiPAP, and CPAP machines due to potential health risks. Gradual degradation of foam in the devices, intended to reduce noise and vibrations during operation, could result in patients inhaling particulates or certain chemicals. The recall involved around 3 to 4 million machines which, in addition to the COVID-19 pandemic, contributed to a supply chain crisis impeding the availability of these devices to patients. Originally, Philips described the risks as potentially "life-threatening" but that there had been no reports of death as a result of the issues. Since then, the FDA has received 385 reports of death allegedly caused by the foam issue.

In 2023, ProPublica and the Pittsburgh Post-Gazette reported that Philips had received thousands of patient reports and returned machines affected by the degrading foam as far back as 2010, and many of these reports were not disclosed to the FDA as Philips was legally obligated to do.

In October 2022, dozens of lawsuits against Philips related to the safety concerns were consolidated into one class-action lawsuit. Philips settled this lawsuit in September 2023 for at least $479 million. In January 2024, Philips agreed to halt the sale of any new sleep apnea devices in the US as part of an agreement with the FDA. As part of the deal, Philips would need to meet certain conditions in its US manufacturing plants, a process that Philips CEO Roy Jakobs said could take five to seven years.

== Environmental record ==
=== Planned obsolescence ===
Philips was a member of the 1925 Phoebus cartel along with Osram, Tungsram, Associated Electrical Industries, ELIN, Compagnie des Lampes, International General Electric, and the GE Overseas Group, holding shares in the Swiss corporation proportional to their lamp sales. The cartel lowered operational costs and worked to standardize the life expectancy of light bulbs at 1,000 hours (down from 2,500 hours), and raised prices without fear of competition. The cartel tested their bulbs and fined manufacturers for bulbs that lasted more than 1,000 hours.

=== Green initiatives ===
Philips also runs the EcoVision initiative, which commits to a number of environmentally positive improvements, focusing on energy efficiency. The company marks its "green" products with the Philips Green Logo, identifying them as products which have a significantly better environmental performance than their competitors or predecessors.

=== L-Prize competition ===
In 2011, Philips won a $10 million cash prize from the US Department of Energy for winning its L-Prize competition, to produce a high-efficiency, long operating life replacement for a standard 60-W incandescent lightbulb. The winning LED lightbulb, which was made available to consumers in April 2012, produces slightly more than 900 lumens at an input power of 10 W.

=== Greenpeace ranking ===
In Greenpeace's 2012 Guide to Greener Electronics that ranks electronics manufacturers on sustainability, climate and energy and how green their products are, Philips ranked 10th of 16 companies with a score of 3.8/10. The company was the top scorer in the Energy section due to its energy advocacy work calling upon the EU to adopt a 30% reduction for greenhouse gas emissions by 2020. It was also praised for its new products which are free from PVC plastic and BFRs. However, the guide criticized Philips' sourcing of fibres for paper, arguing it must develop a paper procurement policy which excludes suppliers involved in deforestation and illegal logging.

Philips has made progress since 2007 (when it was first ranked in the guide started in 2006), in particular by supporting the Individual Producer Responsibility principle meaning that the company is accepting the responsibility for the toxic impacts of its products on e-waste dumps around the world.

=== Dubai Lamp ===
In 2016 Philips introduced a series of LED lamps with an efficiency up to 200lm/W. The Dubai Lamp produces 600 lumens at an input power of 3 W.

== Publications ==
- A. Heerding: The origin of the Dutch incandescent lamp industry. (Vol. 1 of The history of N.V. Philips gloeilampenfabriek). Cambridge: Cambridge University Press, 1986. ISBN 0-521-32169-7
- A. Heerding: A company of many parts. (Vol. 2 of The history of N.V. Philips' gloeilampenfabrieken). Cambridge: Cambridge University Press, 1988. ISBN 0-521-32170-0
- I.J. Blanken: The development of N.V. Philips' Gloeilampenfabrieken into a major electrical group. Zaltbommel: European Library, 1999. (Vol. 3 of The history of Philips Electronics N.V.). ISBN 90-288-1439-6
- I.J. Blanken: Under German rule. Zaltbommel: European Library, 1999. (Vol. 4 of The history of Philips Electronics N.V). ISBN 90-288-1440-X
