= Teletrol =

American automation systems supplier

Teletrol System
- Industry: Lighting Technologies
- Founded: 1985
- Headquarters: Manchester, NH, United States
- Area served: Nationwide
- Products: Multi-site building environment controllers
- Owner: Philips Electronics
- Number of employees: 37
- Parent: Philips Electronics
- Website: http://www.teletrol.com/

Teletrol (Teletrol Systems Inc.) is a United States company based in Manchester, NH. Teletrol is a supplier of building automation systems and components. Its products are designed to centralize the management and control of heating/cooling (HVAC) and lighting systems to reduce energy consumption and operating costs for organizations with multiple locations. Teletrol's products consist of hardware components (thermostatic controllers) installed at remote sites, and browser-based software that is used to communicate between those sites and the central location via HTTP.

Teletrol was privately owned by Dean Kamen until July 15, 2009.

Teletrol has been recently acquired by Philips Electronics.

Teletrol, Inc was incorporated by founder Richard Clemmons in Madison, Wisconsin as a Wisconsin corporation in early 1981. Operating primarily in Northern Illinois, Teletrol successfully developed and manufactured a line of energy management products that were designed to be easy to use. In December 1981, a controlling interest in Teletrol, Inc was acquired by Anchor Hocking Corporation, a Fortune-500 corporation at that time. In late 1984, Anchor Hocking Corporation acquired the remaining outstanding stock in Teletrol from its founder, Richard Clemmons, and subsequently entered into an acquisition agreement with Mr. Dean Kamen of Manchester, NH, who subsequently reorganized and renamed the company.
