= Robert W. Hutson =

American dentist

Robert William Hutson (June 20, 1919 – May 20, 2001) was an American entrepreneur, inventor, and dentist who is best known for inventing the Oral-B toothbrush.

== Biography ==
Robert W. Hutson was born on June 20, 1919, in San Luis Obispo County, California. Hutson was an only child. He grew up in the Watsonville, California area.

Hutson studied dentistry at the University of California, San Francisco, and graduated in 1943.

Robert Hutson served in the United States Navy during World War II. Afterwards, he set up a dental practice near the San Jose Hospital. By 1949, he discovered a new way to make a toothbrush that used hundreds of small filaments of nylon to be both strong and gentle on the gums. Hutson was issued a design patent on October 24, 1950, for the design of the toothbrush and subsequently gained a full patent in 1958. Hutson sold the brush business in the 1960s.

He died on May 20, 2001, a month before his 82nd birthday.
