= Lifeline Systems, Inc. =

Lifeline Systems, Inc. is a medical alarm company founded in Boston, MA in 1974. The company was founded by gerontologist Andrew S. Dibner and his wife, sociologist Susan S. Dibner.

== History ==
Dibner, a psychology professor at Boston University, was on sabbatical at Duke University in 1972 when he conceived the idea that, if an elderly or disabled person falls and/or needs help, it could be of life-saving benefit to have a technology in their home that could summon an ambulance for them – even if they could not get to a phone.

On Nov. 2, 1974, Dibner filed his initial patent entitled "Automatic Alarm System" and the U.S. patent #3,989,900 was awarded Nov. 2, 1976. Other patents followed. The wireless push-button-activated automatic alarm system became known as “Personal Emergency Response Service (PERS)” and Lifeline Systems Inc. grew to provide PERS across the United States and Canada. Dibner is considered to be the father of PERS in the United States.

In 1975, Lifeline Systems Inc., together with Hebrew Rehabilitation Center for Aged in Roslindale, MA and the Boston University Gerontology Center, received a grant from the National Center for Health Services Research to test the efficacy of PERS. The report, which compared older persons living alone with PERS and a control group, showed important reductions in the need for nursing home days along with enhanced quality of life and savings in the cost of health care.

L. Dennis Shapiro, joined the company in the fall of 1978 as CEO (1978–88) and Chairman (1978–2006). He attracted venture financing and initiated product redesign embodying new patents. Marketing was directed to hospitals and other healthcare organizations which began to include PERS as a component of outreach and community wellness. In these early years, each hospital operated its own call center at a place that had 24×7 coverage, such as the switchboard or the emergency room. Lifeline Systems provided call center equipment, subscriber units and training of installer and monitoring personnel.

At the time of its IPO in 1983, Lifeline Systems reported programs at 528 hospitals and other healthcare providers, and had shipped 21,931 subscriber units. To service growth, Lifeline developed high-capacity PERS call center technology and offered central monitoring to its customers. Arthur Phipps became CEO 1989–1992. In 1991 Lifeline Systems received the Shingo Prize for Operational Excellence. Ron Feinstein was CEO 1993–2006, a period of internal growth complemented by acquisitions.

Lifeline Systems, Inc. was acquired by Royal Philips Electronics in 2006, at which time it reported PERS programs with 2,500 healthcare providers across the United States and Canada, and central monitoring of close to 470,000 subscribers. The merger took place on March 23, 2006.

=== Charles A. Dana Award ===
In 1986, the first Charles A. Dana Foundation awards were announced. Andrew and Susan Dibner were awarded a Commendation for "Pioneering Achievement in Health for their Lifeline System of Personal Emergency Response, now bringing greater safety and serenity to 100,000 elderly or disabled people living alone; a creative integration of technology and community that may presage other responses to the needs of an aging population."

=== The status of PERS, 1990 ===
Dibner and Shapiro established the non-profit American Lifeline Institute in 1986. Its initial project was to sponsor the First International Symposium on Emergency Response Services for Frail Person Living Alone, Washington, DC, May 31 – June 2, 1990. Papers were presented by representatives from 12 countries reporting on the state and status of PERS.
