= Oral-B Glide =

Dental floss brand

- Glide dental floss sold under the Gore brand and Procter & Gamble's Oral-B and Crest brands
- Product type: Dental floss
- Country: United States
- Introduced: 1971
- Markets: United States
- Previous owners: W. L. Gore & Associates (1971–2003); Procter & Gamble (2003–2010); Gillette (2005)
- Website: www.oralb.com/products/floss/

Oral-B Glide is a PTFE (Teflon) dental floss manufactured by W. L. Gore and Associates exclusively for Procter & Gamble.

== History ==
The origin of Glide (which is what the brand was called prior to the P&G acquisition) dates to 1971, when Bill Gore first used a Gore-Tex fiber to floss his own teeth; Gore-Tex was the PTFE-based fiber he had invented as a "waterproof laminate". The company failed to market the product for more than three decades. Ultimately, it succeeded by marketing to dentists rather than selling the floss as a consumer product. It was widely adopted, and grew to be the #1 brand of floss in dental office use, and #2 floss in retail.

In September 2003, Gore sold the brand to Procter & Gamble, who at the time announced its intention to brand the product under the Crest product line. The terms of the sale provided that Gore would continue to manufacture and develop the product. In 2010, Procter & Gamble rebranded the product as Oral-B Glide.

== Popularity and sales ==
In 2006, Crest Glide was the second-ranked brand of dental floss in the United States, with sales (in supermarkets and drug stores) of $22 million and a market share of 18.8%, just behind Johnson & Johnson Reach.

== Environmental and health concerns ==
Environmentalists have recommended non-PTFE brands, discouraging the use of the environmentally unfriendly Teflon. There is also a health concern given the use of perfluorooctanoic acid, a possible carcinogen, in the making of Teflon. A 2019 study showed that some women who had flossed with Glide had elevated levels of perfluorohexanesulfonic acid (PFHxS) in their blood compared to non-flossers, and fluorine compounds were identified in Glide (as well as 5 other brands of floss out of 18 brands tested). Procter & Gamble, however, disputes this finding. "The study, led by Silent Spring Institute in collaboration with the Public Health Institute in Berkeley, CA, appears online ... in the Journal of Exposure Science & Environmental Epidemiology (JESEE), and is part of a special issue dedicated to PFAS (per- and polyfluoroalkyl substances)."
