= Crest (toothpaste) =

Brand of oral hygiene products

- Logo since 2005
- Product type: Toothpaste
- Current owner: Procter & Gamble
- Country: United States
- Introduced: 1955; 71 years ago
- Markets: Worldwide
- Website: www.crest.com

Crest is an American brand of toothpaste and other oral hygiene products made by Procter & Gamble (P&G) and sold worldwide. In many countries in Europe, it is sold as Blend-A-Med, the name of an established German toothpaste acquired by P&G in 1987 (formerly Blendax GmbH). In many international markets, P&G sells similar oral hygiene formulations under the Oral-B brand.

== History ==
Crest was introduced in the United States as "Fluoristan" in 1954, as it contained stannous fluoride. In 1955, the name of the product was changed to "Crest with Fluoristan". The composition of the toothpaste had been developed by Joseph C. Muhler, Harry Day, and William H. Nebergall at Indiana University, and was patented by Nebergall. Procter & Gamble paid royalties from use of the patent and thus financed a new dental research institute at this university ("The House that Crest built"). The active ingredient of Crest was changed in 1981 to sodium fluoride, or "Fluoristat", which it uses today as "Dentifrice with Fluoristat"; Crest Pro-Health uses stannous fluoride again and an abrasive whitener together called "Polyfluorite". Crest is accepted by the American Dental Association (ADA), as well as by equivalent dental associations in other countries.

One notable ad campaign from the brand was in the late 1970s and early 1980s, written and produced by Gregory Sinnott and designed by comic book artist Herb Trimpe, where animated ads featured the "Cavity Creeps", a group of grey-colored, rocky humanoid creatures bent on destroying the city of "Toothopolis" (essentially an island city protected by an enormous wall of teeth), with their signature battle cry "We make holes in teeth!" They were defeated time and time again by the "Crest Team", a group of people dressed in Crest-themed jumpsuits, who wielded giant toothbrushes and tubes of Crest to not only ward off the Cavity Creeps, but to protect the wall as well. The team would encourage children at the end of each commercial to "watch treats and see your dentist" so they could fight cavities "like the Crest Team."

From 2004 to 2010, Crest sold dental floss under the Crest Glide brand, which is now called Oral-B Glide. After Procter & Gamble bought Gillette (which owned Oral-B), marketing for both was done together under "Pro-Health".

== Manufacturing plants ==
Crest products are made in North America according to Procter & Gamble. Their main manufacturing plant is located in Greensboro, NC. Some products are manufactured in Guanajuato, Mexico.

== Product line ==
Crest has also been associated with about twenty brands of dental care products, including toothpaste, toothbrushes, mouthwash, dental floss, and a tooth-whitening product called Crest Whitestrips.

Crest Toothpaste has a total of eight product lines:

- Gum Health
- 3D White
- Kid's Crest
- Pro-Health
- Sensitivity
- Enamel
- Clean + Fresh
- Future-Proof

== Crest Pro-Health mouthwash side effects ==
=== Tooth staining ===
Crest Pro-Health mouthwash contains cetylpyridinium chloride which is known to cause tooth staining in approximately 3 percent of users. Crest has noted that this staining is actually an indication that the product is working as intended, as the stains are a result of bacteria dying on the teeth. Crest stated that because of the low incidence of staining, there was no need to label Pro-Health mouthwash as a potential tooth stainer. However, after numerous complaints and a federal class-action lawsuit, which was later dismissed, the mouthwash now contains a label warning consumers of its potential to stain teeth.

=== Reducing premature birth ===
The use of Crest Pro-Health mouthwash during pregnancy has been shown to be associated with a decrease in preterm births, presumably because the mouthwash reduces the severity of periodontal disease, which is directly linked to preterm births.

== Timeline ==
- 1955, Crest with Fluoristan was launched in a number of test markets in the United States.
- In January 1956, Crest was launched nationally.
- In 1976, the American Chemical Society named Crest with fluoride one of the greatest discoveries in the past 100 years.

== See also ==
- Crest Whitestrips
- List of toothpaste brands
- Index of oral health and dental articles
