= Oral-B =

American brand of oral hygiene products

- Logo since 2020
- Product type: Oral hygiene
- Current owner: Procter & Gamble
- Country: United States
- Introduced: January 13, 1950; 76 years ago
- Markets: Worldwide
- Previous owners: The Gillette Company
- Website: oralb.com

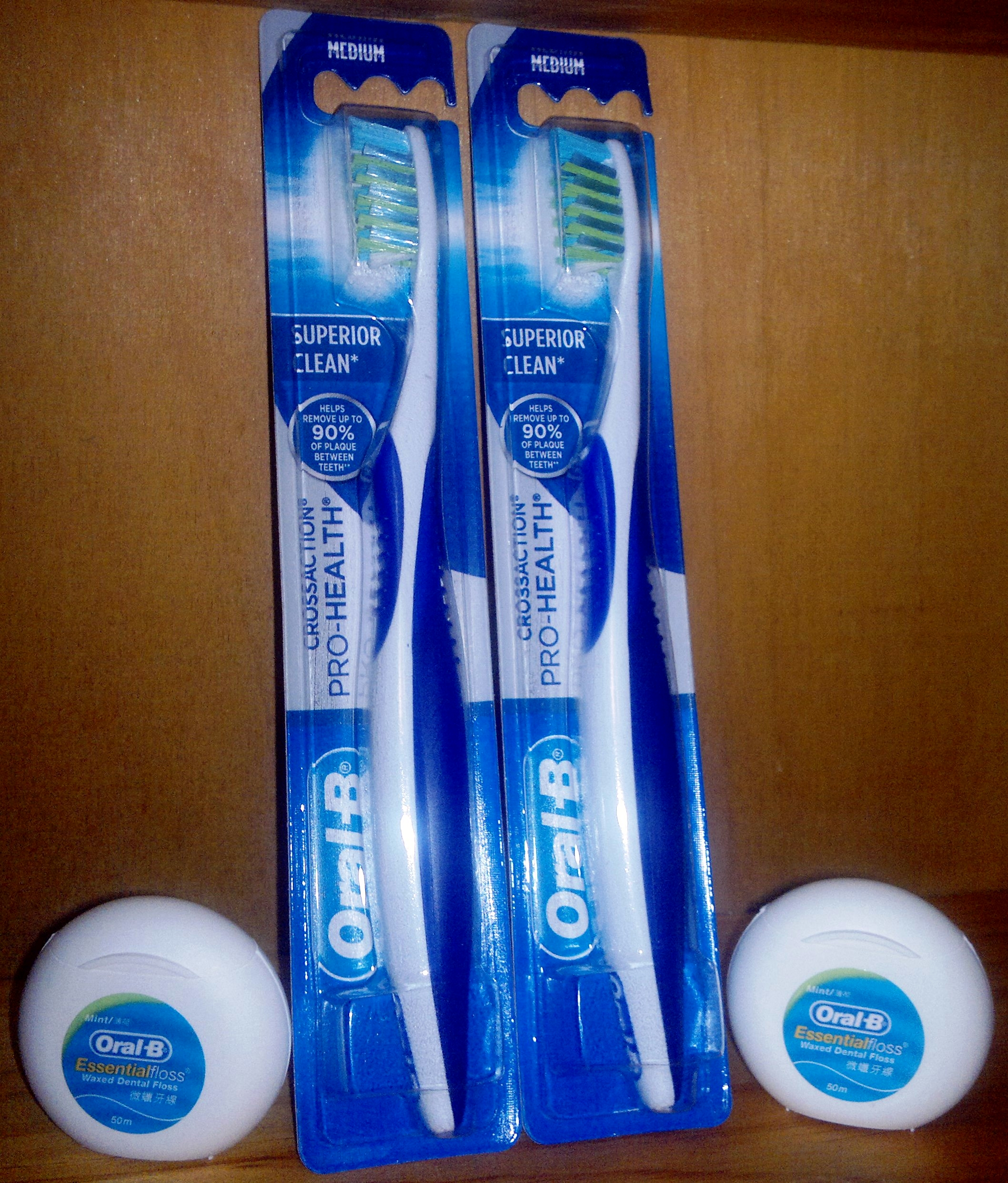
Oral-B toothbrushes and dental floss, purchased in 2011

Oral-B is an American brand of oral hygiene products currently owned by Procter & Gamble. Its products include toothpastes, toothbrushes, electric toothbrushes, and mouthwashes. The brand was launched in 1950 in California by Robert W. Hutson, who was a pioneer of modern toothbrushes. Oral-B has market availability in 150-170 countries.

== History ==
Robert W. Hutson (1919–2001), owner of a periodontal practice in San Jose, began designing a toothbrush in the 1940s.

By 1949, he discovered that thin, round-ended, nylon filaments would be gentle on the gums yet effective for cleaning teeth.

Hutson patented a toothbrush in 1950. The application for a design patent for his "Hutson toothbrush" was filed on January 13, 1950, and U.S. Design Patent No. 160,604 was granted on October 24 the same year.

In 1958, he was granted a utility patent for a "mouthbrush" having fine, soft, flat-ended nylon bristles, and a similar appearance to the 1950 design. He claimed in his application that the brush was less abrasive to tooth enamel, more effective at massaging the gums, and better at picking up tooth powder than other brushes available at the time, which featured coarse, angle-cut bristles.

The toothbrushes were made by the Owens Brush Company. The partners placed a $10,000 order for brushes and hired the first two salespeople. In order to create demand for new brushes, the sales team devoted almost all of their time to communicating with dentists, passing samples, and outreach work. The result of these efforts has been a steady increase in the number of orders. The next successful step was the decision to participate in the conventions and conferences of dentists held in the state of California.

Robert Hutson also created the Oral-B brand name. The first product was known as the "Oral-B 60", because it had 60 tufts. Other sizes were made with differing numbers of tufts and corresponding names. Hutson sold his toothbrush business in the 1960s, and continued his San Jose periodontal practice.

Oral-B became part of the Gillette group in 1984. Braun, also part of the Gillette group at that time, started to use the Oral-B brand for electric toothbrushes. Procter & Gamble bought Gillette in 2005 and marketed Oral-B together with Crest under Pro-Health in 2007. A company representative has stated that the "B" in Oral-B stands for "brush".

In 2013, Colombian singer Shakira was chosen as the brand ambassador and spokesperson for the 3D White campaign.

== Products ==
- 1991: Bristle color fades with wear (Indicator toothbrush, Edison Awards winner)
- 1996: IDEO begins design of Oral-B for kids
- 1998: Angled bristles (CrossAction toothbrush)
- 2005: Oral-B Triumph ProfessionalCare 9000 enters the North American market featuring "smart technology". The Gillette Company is acquired by Procter & Gamble, uniting Oral-B and Crest beneath the umbrella of P&G Oral Care.
- 2010: Oral-B Triumph 5000 enters the international market, equipped with touch, sound and light indicators that notify of the need to change the nozzle.

== See also ==
- Index of oral health and dental articles
- List of Procter & Gamble brands
- List of toothpaste brands
- Oral-B Glide
