= List of ghost towns in Illinois =

This is a list of ghost towns in the U.S. state of Illinois.

== Ghost towns ==
Town name	Other name(s)	County	Established	Disestablished	Remarks
Anderson		Macoupin			
Appleton		Knox			
Barr		Macoupin			
Benjaminville		McLean			
Bethel		Clay			
Bloomfield		Edgar			
Bourbonais		Bureau			
Brownsville		Jackson			
Brush Point		DeKalb			
Bybee		Fulton			
Caledonia		Putnam			
Cardiff		Livingston			
Cayuga		Livingston			
Challacombe		Macoupin			
Chamness		Williamson			
Civer		Fulton			
Clayville		Sangamon			
Clifford		Williamson			
Coltonville		DeKalb			
Comer		Macoupin			
Crawfordsville		Crawford			
Daggett		Carroll			
Dutton		Pike			
Elm Point		Bond			
Elton		Winnebago			
Enos		Macoupin			
Evans		Logan			
Fillmore		Douglas			
Fremont		Clinton			
Gostyn	East Grove	DuPage			Now a neighborhood in Downers Grove
Green Rock		Henry			Now a neighborhood in Colona
Greenridge		Macoupin			
Griffin		Clark			
Griggsville Landing	Phillips Landing, Phillips Ferry	Pike			
Gurney		Cass			
Hagaman		Macoupin			
Half Day		Lake			Annexed by Vernon Hills
Halfway		Williamson			Not confused to be the same as Halfway, known as Little Juarez.
Halfway	Little Juarez	Williamson			Not to be confused Halfway, Illinois, the one without a nickname.
Henpeck		Kane			
Horace		Edgar			
Jugtown		Grundy			Now part of Goose Lake Prairie State Natural Area
Kumler		McLean			
Ledford		Saline			
Lemmon		Sangamon			
Lexington		Edwards			
Little Rock		LaSalle			
Macoupin		Macoupin			
McVey		Macoupin			
Midway		Fulton			
Miles Station	Providence	Macoupin			
Mills Prairie		Edwards			
Millsdale		Will			
Millville		Jo Daviess			
Milton		Brown			
Morse		Stark			
Ocoya		Livingston			
Old Evansville					
Old Westville					
Orchard Place		Cook			Dissolved for construction of O'Hare Airport. Airport abbreviation "ORD" based on this ghost town.
Oxford Township	Oxford	Henry			
Palmyra		Edwards			
Papsville					
Parker City	Parker	Johnson			
Piankashawtown		Edwards			
Reader	Reeders	Macoupin			
Reeds Crossing		Boone			
Riverview					
Rodden		Jo Daviess			
Santa Fe Park					
Schoper		Macoupin			
Shasta		Alexander			
Shirley		McLean			
Sugarville		Fulton			
Sylvan		Cass			
Tacaogane		Massac or Pope			
Techny		Cook		1989	Now a neighborhood in Northbrook
Tedens		DuPage			
Totten Prairie	Totten’s Prairie	Fulton			
Tracy		Kankakee			
Tuscumbia		Fulton			
Vishnu Springs		McDonough			
Wanborough		Edwards			
Weston		DuPage		December 16, 1966	Dissolved for construction of Fermilab though several buildings remain as dorms.
Wetzel		Edgar			
Whistleville		Macon			Now site of Fort Daniel Conservation Area.
White Oak Springs		Brown			
Wilson		Lake			
