= List of city name changes =

This is a list of cities and towns whose names were officially changed at one or more points in history. It does not include gradual changes in spelling that took place over long periods of time.

see also: Geographical renaming, List of names of European cities in different languages, and List of renamed places in the United States

== Afghanistan ==
- Alexandria Ariana → Herat
- Alexandria Arachosia → Kandahar
- Alexandria in Opiania → Ghazni
- Alexandria on the Oxus → Ai-Khanoum
- Bactra → Balkh
- Adina Pur → Jalalabad

== Algeria ==
- Ikosium → Icosium → Algiers
- Géryville → El Bayadh
- Cirta → Constantine
- Hippo Regius → Bône → Annaba
- Rusicade → Philippeville → Skikda
- Castellum Tingitanum → Orléansville → El Asnam → Chlef
- Malaca → Calama → Guelma
- Colomb-Béchar → Béchar
- Saint André de Mers-el-Kébir → Mers-el-Kébir
- Saldae → Bougie → Béjaïa
- Fort Laperrine → Tamanrasset

== Argentina ==
- La Plata → Ciudad Eva Perón (1952) → La Plata (1955)
- Ciudad de la Santísima Trinidad y Puerto de Santa María del Buen Aire → Buenos Aires

== Australia ==
=== New South Wales ===
- Blackman's Flat → Orange
- Currajong → Bushman's → Parkes
- Dumbletown → Beverly Hills
- Germanton → Holbrook
- Mayday Hills → Beechworth

=== Northern Territory ===
- Port Darwin → Palmerston → Darwin
- Stuart → Alice Springs

=== Queensland ===
- Limestone Station → Ipswich

=== South Australia ===
- Hummock Hill → Whyalla
- Mobilong → Murray Bridge

=== Tasmania ===
- Emu Bay → Burnie

=== Victoria ===
- Ballaarat → Ballarat
- Bearbrass → Melbourne
- Belfast → Port Fairy
- Bendigo's Creek → Sandhurst → Bendigo
- Bryan Creek Crossing → Coleraine
- Emerald Hill → South Melbourne
- Flooding Creek → Sale
- Hotham → North Melbourne
- McGuire's Punt → Sheppardtown → Shepparton

=== Western Australia ===
- Newcastle → Toodyay

== Austria ==
- Fucking → Fugging (1836)
- Fucking → Fugging (2021)
- Mattersdorf → Mattersburg (1926)

== Belgium ==
- Charnoy → Charleroi (1666)

== Bolivia ==
- Charará → General Eugenio Alejandrino Garay (1955)
- Fortín General Camacho / Fortín López de Filippis → Mariscal José Félix Estigarribia (1944)

== Botswana ==
- Gaberones → Gaborone (1969)

== Bosnia and Herzegovina ==
- Bosanska Dubica → Kozarska Dubica (1992)
- Bosanska Gradiška → Gradiška
- Bosanska Kostajnica → Kostajnica
- Bosanski Brod → Brod
- Bosanski Novi → Novi Grad
- Bosanski Šamac → Šamac
- Bosansko Petrovo Selo → Petrovo
- Delminium → Županjac → Županj-potok → Županjac → Duvno → Tomislavgrad → Duvno → Tomislavgrad
- Drvar → Titov Drvar (1981) → Drvar (1991)
- Hvoča → Foča → Srbinje → Foča
- Novi Travnik → Pucarevo (1980 - 1992) → Novi Travnik
- Skender Vakuf → Kneževo
- Široki Brig → Lištica (1952 - 1992) → Široki Brijeg

== Brazil ==
- Adolfo Konder → Vidal Ramos
- Embu → Embu das Artes
- Felisberto Caldeira → São Gonçalo do Rio Preto
- Hamônia → Ibirama
- Hansa Humboldt → Corupá
- Jabaeté → Viana
- Neu-Zürich → Dalbérgia → Neu Breslau → Presidente Getúlio
- Nossa Senhora do Desterro → Florianópolis (1893)
- Nova Danzig → Cambé
- Palmira → Santos Dumont
- Piçarras → Balneário Piçarras
- Filipeia de Nossa Senhora das Neves → Paraíba → João Pessoa
- Porto dos Casais → Porto Alegre
- Presidente Soares → Alto Jequitibá
- Lugar de Barra → Manaus (1832) → São José da Barra do Rio Negro (1848) → Manaus (1856)
- São José del Rey → Tiradentes (1889)
- Veado → Siqueira Campos → Guaçuí
- Vila do Espírito Santo → Vila Velha
- Vila Nova do Espírito Santo → Vitória
- Vila Rica → Ouro Preto
- São Salvador → Bahia → Salvador

== Brunei ==
- Brunei Town (Bandar Brunei) → Bandar Seri Begawan (1970)
- Brooketon → Muara
- Padang Berawa → Seria

== Bulgaria ==
- Ratiaria → Archar
- Asenovgrad → Stanimaka → Asenovgrad (1934)
- Scaptopara → Cuma-i Bala (Yukarı Cuma) → Gorna Dzhumaya → Blagoevgrad
- Orhanie → Botevgrad
- Pyrgos → Burgaz →Burgas
- Hadzhioglu Pazardzhik → Tolbukhin (1949) → Dobrich (1990)
- Dupniche → Marek → Stanke Dimitrov → Dupnitsa
- Nevrokop → Gotse Delchev
- Ortaköy → Ivailovgrad
- Pautalia → Velbazhd → Köstendil → Kyustendil
- Golyama Kutlovitsa → Kutlofça → Ferdinand (1890)→ Mihailovgrad (1945) → Montana (1993)
- Mesembria → Misivri→ Nesebar
- Tatar Pazardzhik → Pazardzhik
- Kendros (Kendrisos/Kendrisia) → Odryssa → Eumolpia → Philipopolis → Trimontium → Ulpia → Flavia → Julia → Paldin/Ploudin → Poulpoudeva → Filibe → Plovdiv
- Anchialos → Tuthom → Anhyolu → Anhialo → Pomorie
- Ruschuk (Rusčuk) → Rousse
- Şumnu → Shumen → Kolarovgrad (1950) → Shumen (1965)
- Durostorum → Dorostol → Drastar → Silistre → Silistra
- Bashmakli → Ahiçelebi → Smolyan
- Serdica → Sredets → Triaditsa → Sofya →Sofia
- Beroe → Vereya (Beroya) → Ulpia Augusta Trajana → Irinopolis → Boruy → Vereya → Eski Zağra → Zheleznik → Stara Zagora
- Golyamo Konare → Saedinenie
- Eski Dzhumaia (Eski Cuma) → Targovishte
- Vassiliko → Tsarevo → Michurin → Tsarevo
- Odesos → Varna → Stalin (1949)→ Varna (1956)
- Tarnovgrad → Tarnovo → Tırnova → Tarnovo → Veliko Tarnovo
- Bononia → Bdin → Vidin

== Canada ==
=== Alberta ===
- Hobbema → Maskwacis

=== British Columbia ===
- Fort George → Prince George
- Fort Camosun → Fort Victoria → Victoria
- Westbank → West Kelowna
- Granville → Vancouver
- ch’átlich → Sechelt

=== Manitoba ===
- Prince of Wales Fort → Churchill

=== New Brunswick ===
- Fort LaTour → Saint John
- Léger Corner → Dieppe
- Ste. Anne's Point → Fredericton

=== Nunavut ===
- Frobisher Bay → Iqaluit
- Repulse Bay → Naujaat

=== Ontario ===
- Hens and Chickens Harbour → Collingwood
- New Johnstown → Cornwall
- Rat Portage → Kenora
- Fort Frontenac → Kingston
- Ebytown → Berlin → Kitchener (see Berlin to Kitchener name change)
- Newark → Niagara-on-the-Lake
- Bytown → Ottawa
- Scott's Plains → Peterborough
- Shipman's Corners → St. Catharines
- Sainte-Anne-des-Pins → Sudbury → Greater Sudbury
- Fort Rouillé → Toronto → York → Toronto
- Aqueduct → Merritsville → Welland

=== Prince Edward Island ===
- Port la Joie → Charlottetown

=== Québec ===
- Asbestos → Val-des-Sources
- Hochelaga → Ville-Marie → Mont-Royal → Montreal
- Hull → Gatineau

=== Saskatchewan ===
- Oskana (Romanized as Wascana) → Regina
- Prussia → Leader

== Central African Republic ==
- Gribingui → Fort-Crampel → Crampel → Kaga-Bandoro
- Fort-Brusseaux → Markounda

== Chad ==
- Faya → Largeau → Faya-Largeau → Faya (proposed)
- Fort Archambault → Sarh
- Fort-Foureau → Kousséri
- Fort Lamy → N'Djamena

== Chile ==
- Barrancas → Pudahuel
- Estación Rinconada → Laja
- La Greda → La Unión → Pisco Elqui
- Lago Buenos Aires → Chile Chico
- Melipulli → Puerto Montt
- Mincha → Canela
- Monterrey → Monte Patria
- Navarino → Cabo de Hornos
- Nuestra Señora de las Mercedes de Puerto Claro → Valparaíso
- Nuestra Señora de las Mercedes de Tutuvén → Cauquenes
- Nueva Bilbao → Constitución
- Peña Blanca → Marchihue
- Pueblo Hundido → Diego de Almagro
- Punta Arenas → Magallanes City → Punta Arenas
- Rinconada de Parral → Retiro
- Samo Alto → Río Hurtado
- San Carlos de Chiloé → Ancud
- San José de Logroño → Melipilla
- Santa Cruz de Triana → Rancagua
- Valdivia de Lontué → Sagrada Familia
- Yungay → Quinta Normal

== China ==
- Amoy† → Hsia-men† → Xiamen
- Ji → Yanjing → Zhongdu → Dadu → Jingshi → Khanbalik (as Mongol capital) → Peking † → Peiping → Beijing
- Fenghao (豐鎬) → Chang'an (長安) or Xijing (西京) → Daxing (大興) → Fengyuan (奉元) → Anxi (安西) → Jingzhao (京兆) → Xi'an (西安)
- Iling → Ichang† → Yichang
- Jiankang → Jiangning → Jinling → Nanking† → Nanjing
- Bianliang → Bianjing → Kaifeng
- Lin'an → Hangchow† → Hangzhou
- Soochow† → Suzhou
- Yinxu → Anyang
- Shenyang → Shengjing → Fengtianfu → Mukden → Fengtian → Shenyang
- Ch'ing-ni-wa → Lüshunkou (aka Port Arthur) → Dalnyi → Dairen; Ryojun → Lüda→ Dalian
- Kweisui† → Guisui → Hohhot
- Tihua† → Dihua → Ürümqi
- Changchun → Hsinking → Changchun

†Name change in English due to replacement of postal romanization with the pinyin system. The Chinese name is unchanged.

== Colombia ==
- Bacatá → Santa Fe de Bacatá → Bogotá → Santa Fe de Bogotá → Bogotá
- Obando → Puerto Inírida → Inirida
- Patriarca San José → Cúcuta → San José de Cucúta → Cúcuta
- Valle de Upar → Ciudad de los Santos Reyes de Valledupar → Valle Dupar → Valledupar
- Nuestra Señora Santa María de los Remedios del Cabo de la Vela → Nuestra Señora de los Remedios del Río de la Hacha → Riohacha
- Barbudo → Santiago de Sompayón → Tamalameque → Santiago de Sompayón Nuestra Señora de la Candelaria de El Banco → El Banco
- San Jerónimo de Buenavista → Pereira
- Apiay → Villavicencio
- Pueblo Viejo → San Francisco de Quibdó → Quibdó
- San Bonifacio de Ibagué del valle de las Lanzas → Ibagué
- Villaviciosa de la Concepción de la Provincia de Hatunllacta → Villaviciosa de la Concepción de San Juan de los Pastos → San Juan de Pasto
- San Antonio → Leticia
- Santa Cruz de Pizarro → Santa Cruz de San José → Sitionuevo → Sitio Nuevo
- Villa Holguín → Armenia

== Republic of the Congo ==
- Ncouna → Brazzaville (1884)
- Dolisie → Loubomo (1975) → Dolisie (1991)
- Jacob → Nkayi (1975)
- Rousset (1903) → Fort-Rousset (1904) → Owando (1977)
- Ponta Negra → Pointe-Noire

== Croatia ==
- Militär Sanct Georgen → Đurđevac
- Ragusa → Dubrovnik
- Mursa → Essegg, Eszék → Osijek
- Sankt Veit am Fluß (German) → Fiume (Italian) → Rijeka
- Iader → Jadera → Zara → Zadar
- Agram, Zagrab → Zagreb
- Zaravecchia → Biograd na Moru
- Pinguente → Buzet
- Cherso → Cres
- Porto Re → Kraljevica
- Albona → Labin
- Lesina → Hvar
- Lussinpiccolo → Mali Lošinj
- Cittanova (d'Istria) → Novigrad
- Dignano → Vodnjan
- Ploče → Kardeljevo → Ploče
- San Pietro della Brazza → Supetar
- Spalato → Split

== Czech Republic ==
- Braunau → Broumov
- Brünn → Brno
- Budweis → České Budějovice
- Černý Kostelec → Kostelec nad Černými lesy
- Cukmantl → Zlaté Hory
- Falknov → Sokolov
- Frývaldov → Jeseník
- Iglau → Jihlava
- Krummau → Český Krumlov
- Německý Brod → Havlíčkův Brod
- Německé Jablonné → Jablonné v Podještědí
- Olmütz → Olomouc
- Otrokovice → Baťov → Otrokovice
- Pilsen → Plzeň
- Reichenberg → Liberec
- Troppau → Opava
- Zlín → Gottwaldov → Zlín

== Dominican Republic ==
- Santo Domingo → Ciudad Trujillo (1936–1961) → Santo Domingo

== Egypt ==
Many cities had Ancient Egyptian, Greek, and Latin names.

- Iunyt, Ta-senet → Latopolis → Laton → Lato → Esna

== Equatorial Guinea ==
- Port Clarence → Santa Isabel → Malabo

== Finland ==
- Kokkola/Gamlakarleby → Kokkola/Karleby (1977, only the Swedish name changed)
- Mustasaari/Mussor → Wasa → Nikolaistad/Nikolainkaupunki (1862) → Vasa/Vaasa (1917)
- Pargas/Parainen → Väståboland/Länsi-Turunmaa (2009) → Pargas/Parainen (2012)
- Pyhäjärvi → Pyhäsalmi (1993) → Pyhäjärvi (1996)

== France ==
See also List of French cities renamed during the Revolution

Most cities had an ancient name, usually in Latin, often of older Celtic origin

- Andemantunum → Langres
- Argentoratum → Strassburg → Strasbourg
- Augustobona → Troyes
- Augustodunum → Autun
- Augustodurum → Bayeux
- Augustonemetum → Clermont-Ferrand
- Avaricum → Bourges
- Caesarodunum → Tours
- Cenabum → Cenabum Aureliani → Aurelianum → Orléans
- Condevicnum → Portus Namnetum → Nantes
- Divodurum → Metz
- Divona → Cahors
- Durocortorum → Reims
- Elimberris → Auch
- Forum Iulii → Fréjus
- Gesocribate → Brest
- Gesoriacum → Bononia → Boulogne-sur-Mer
- Iuliomagus → Angers
- La Haye-en-Touraine → La Haye-Descartes → Descartes
- Lapurdum → Bayonne
- Limonum → Poitiers
- Lugdunum Convenarum → Saint-Bertrand-de-Comminges
- Lugdunum Consoranorum → Saint-Lizier
- Lutetia → Paris
- Mediolanium → Saintes
- Mediolanum Aulercorum → Évreux
- Nemetacum → Arras
- Noviodunum Aeduorum → Nevirnum → Nevers
- Samarobriva → Amiens
- Segodunum → Rodez

== Germany ==
- Aquae Mattiacorum → Wiesbaden
- Augusta Vindelicorum → Augsburg
- Aurelia Aquensi → Baden-Baden
- Barmen-Elberfeld → Wuppertal
- Bötzow → Oranienburg
- Bremerhaven → Wesermünde → Bremerhaven
- Buchhorn → Friedrichshafen
- Chemnitz → Karl-Marx-Stadt (1953) → Chemnitz (1990)
- Colonia Claudia Ara Agrippinensium → Köln (English: Cologne)
- Colonia Nemetum → Speyer
- Klenow → Ludwigslust
- Lietzow → Lietzenburg → Charlottenburg
- Lochau → Annaburg
- Mogontiacum → Mainz
- Münden → Hannoversch Münden → Hann. Münden
- Neustadt → Dorotheenstadt (in 1710 incorporated into Berlin)
- Rixdorf → Neukölln (in 1920 incorporated into Berlin)
- Sarre-Louis → Sarre-Libre → Saarlouis → Saarlautern → Saarlouis
- Syburg → Carlshaven → Bad Karlshafen
- Stadt des KdF-Wagens bei Fallersleben → Wolfsburg
- Stalinstadt → Eisenhüttenstadt
- Starigard → Aldinborg → Oldenburg in Holstein
- Treuorum → Trier
- Vörde → Bremervörde

== Greenland ==
- Friedrichstal → Frederiksdal → Narsarmijit (Narsaq Kujalleq)
- Godthaab (Godthåb) → Nuuk
- Lichtenau → Alluitsoq
- Lichtenfels → Akunnat
- Neu-Herrnhut → Nye-Hernhut → Noorlit → Old Nuuk

== Guyana ==
- Wismar-MacKenzie-Christianburg → Linden

== Haiti ==
- Cap-Français → Cap-Haïtien

== Hong Kong ==
- Rennie's Mill → Tiu Keng Leng
- Junk Bay → Tseung Kwan O
- Castle Peak → Tuen Mun
- Un Long → Yuen Long

== Indonesia ==
- Amboyna → Ambon
- Bacassie → Bekasi
- Bandjermassing → Banjarmasin
- Bandoeng → Bandung
- Bancalies → Bengkalis
- Bantam → Banten
- Batavia en Ommelanden → DKI Jakarta
- Batavia Centrum → Jakarta Pusat
- Baviaan Eilanden → Kepulauan Bawean
- Benkoelen → Bengkulu
- Billiton → Belitung
- Bonthain → Bantaeng
- Buitenzorg → Bogor
- Cadirie → Kediri
- Catappa → Ketapang
- Cermatta → Karimata
- Cottaringen → Kotawaringin
- Cheribon → Cirebon
- Cuyper Eiland → Pulau Cipir
- Djocjacarta → Yogyakarta
- Duizendeilanden → Kepulauan Seribu
- Emmahaven → Teluk Bayur
- Fort de Kock → Bukittinggi
- Fort Marlborough → Malabero
- Frederik Hendrik Eiland → Pulau Kolepom
- Grisee → Gresik
- Groot Vallei → Baliem
- Hollandia → Jayapura
- Hollandia-binnen → Abepura
- Hollandia-haven → Jayapura Utara
- Koetaradja → Banda Aceh
- Macasser → Makassar
- Meester Cornelis → Jakarta Timur
- Molukken → Maluku
- Oosthaven → Panjang
- Oosthoek → Tapal Kuda
- Pakanbaroe → Pekanbaru
- Passarouang → Pasuruan
- Preanger → Parahyangan
- Riaouw Archipel → Kepulauan Riau
- Rozengain Eiland → Pulau Hatta
- Sammarang → Semarang
- Soerabaija → Surabaya
- Soeracarta → Surakarta
- Stad en Voorsteden → Jakarta Utara
- Sterrengeberte → Pegunungan Bintang
- Tandjoengbalei → Tanjung Balai
- Tjiandjoer → Cianjur
- Weltevreden → Sawah Besar
- Wijncoops-baai → Palabuhan Ratu
- Wisselmeren → Paniai
- Wondammen-baai → Teluk Wondama
- Zaleijer Eilanden → Kepulauan Salayar
- Zuider Benedenlanden → Pesisir Selatan

== Ireland ==
- Bagenalstown → Muine Bheag (1932)
- Charleville → Ráth Luirc (1920s)
- Cove → Queenstown (1849) → Cobh (1922)
- Dún Laoghaire → Kingstown (1821) → Dún Laoghaire (1922)
- Edgeworthstown → Mostrim (1935) → Edgeworthstown (1974)
- Fethard → Fethard-on-Sea (1914)
- Kells → Ceanannas Mór (1929) → Kells (1993)
- Kingwilliamstown → Ballydesmond (1951)
- Lisbrack → Newtownforbes (1750)
- Maryborough → Portlaoise (1929)
- Navan → An Uaimh (1922) → Navan (1971)
- Newbridge → Droichead Nua (1930s)
- Newtownbarry → Bunclody (1950)
- Parsonstown → Birr (1920s)
- Philipstown → Daingean (1922)

== Israel ==
- Nazareth Illit → Nof HaGalil (2019)

== Japan ==
- Akamagaseki → Shimonoseki (1902)
- Asahi → Owariasahi (1970)
- Edo → Tokyo (1868)
- Fuchū → Shizuoka (1869)
- Fukase → Matsumoto (1582)
- Goka → Hiroshima (1591)
- Heian-kyo → Kyoto (1899)
- Hiroshima → Kitahiroshima (1996)
- Hizaori → Asaka (1932)
- Imahama → Nagahama (1575)
- Inokuchi → Gifu (1568)
- Ujiyamada → Ise, Mie (1955)
- Kameyama → Kameoka (1869)
- Kōriyama → Yamatokōriyama (1954)
- Koromo → Toyota (1959)
- Kozukata → Morioka (Keichō era)
- Kurokawa → Wakamatsu → Aizuwakamatsu (1955)
- Kurume → Higashikurume (1970)
- Murayama → Musashimurayama (1970)
- Nagaoka → Nagaokakyō (1972)
- Naniwa → Ōsaka
- Ōminatotanabu → Mutsu (1960)
- Ōmiya → Hitachiōmiya (2004)
- Oshi → Gyōda (1949)
- Ōta → Hitachiōta (1954)
- Ōtsu → Kotsu (672) → Ōtsu (794)
- Ōtsu → Izumiōtsu (1942)
- Sano → Izumisano (1948)
- Sayama → Ōsakasayama (1987)
- Shinobu → Fukushima (1592)
- Takada → Bungotakada (1954)
- Takada → Yamatotakada (1948)
- Takada → Jōetsu (1971)
- Takaoka → Hirosaki (1628)
- Tambaichi → Tenri (1954)
- Tanabe → Kyōtanabe (1997)
- Tsudanuma → Narashino (1954)
- Yamato → Higashiyamato (1970)
- Yabo → Kunitachi (1926)

== Jordan ==
- Rabbath Ammon → Philadelphia → Amman → Ahamant → Amman
- Kerak → Al-Karak

== Kenya ==
- Broderick Falls → Webuye
- Fort Hall → Muranga
- Thompson Falls → Nyahururu

== Laos ==
- Xiang Dong Xiang Thong → Vientiane (1561) → Luang Phra Bang (1695) → Vientiane
- Nakhon Kala Champaknaburisi → Nakhon Champa Nakhaburisi (1713) → Nakhon Champasak (1791) → Champasak [Bassac] (1863) → Pakse (1908)

== Lebanon ==
- Heliopolis → Baalbek
- Derbly, Ahlia, Wahlia, Mahallata, Mayza, Kayza, Athar (Phoenician/Assyrian) → Tripolis (Greek, Latin) → Atrabulus, Tarablus al-Sham (Arabic) → Trablusşam (Turkish) → Tripoli

== Libya ==
- Oea → Tripoli
- Euesperides → Berenice → Hesperides → Barneeq → Marsa ibn Ghazi → Bani Ghazi → Benghazi

== Lithuania ==
- Georgenburg → Jurbarkas
- Memel → Klaipėda (1923)
- Pašešupys → Starapolė (1736) → Marijampolė (1758) → Kapsukas (1956) → Marijampolė (1989)
- Šilokarčema → Šilutė (1923)
- Vilkmergė → Ukmergė (1920s)
- Medininkai → Varniai (16th century)
- Sniečkus → Visaginas (1992)
- Duoliebaičiai → Władysławów/Vladislavovas (1639) → Naumiestis → Kudirkos Naumiestis (1934)
- Zarasai → Novoalexandrovsk (1836) → Ežerėnai (1919) → Zarasai (1929)
- Mažeikiai → Muravyov (1899) → Mažeikiai (1918)

== Mauritius ==
- Port Louis → Port de La Montagne (1794) → Port Nord-Ouest (1795) → Port Napoléon (1803) → Port Louis (1810)

== Malaysia ==
- Jesselton → Kota Kinabalu (1968)
- Port Swettenham → Port Klang (1963)
- Province Wellesley → Seberang Perai
- Victoria → Bandar Labuan
- Teluk Anson → Teluk Intan
- Port Weld → Kuala Sepetang
- Elopura → Sandakan
- Prang Besar → Putrajaya
- Tanjung Puteri → Iskandar Puteri → Johor Bahru
- Nusajaya → Iskandar Puteri

== Mexico ==
- Cajeme → Ciudad Obregón
- Ciudad Real → San Cristobal de las Casas
- Pitic → Hermosillo
- Querétaro → Santiago de Querétaro
- San Juan Bautista → Villahermosa
- El Paso del Norte → Ciudad Juarez
- Tenochtitlán → Ciudad de México
- Valladolid → Morelia
- Zapotlán → Ciudad Guzmán

== Montenegro ==
- Berane → Ivangrad (1949) → Berane (1992)
- Birziminium → Ribnica → Podgorica (1326) → Titograd (1946) → Podgorica (1992)

== Morocco ==
- Tingis → Tangier
- Mazagan → El Jadida
- Tamuda → Tetuán → Tetouan
- Lixus → Larache
- Thamusida → Port Lyautey → Kénitra
- Anfa → Casablanca
- Villa Sanjurjo → Alhucemas → Al Hoceima
- Fedala → Mohammedia
- Sala Colonia → Chellah → Rabat
- Mogador → Essaouira
- Zilis → Arcila → Asilah
- Morocco → Marrakesh
- Ifni → Sidi Ifni
- Ksar es-Souk/Imtaghren → Errachidia
- Louis-Gentil → Youssoufia
- Camp Merchand → Rommani
- Petit Jean → Sidi Kacem
- Castillejos → Fnideq
- El Rincón → Mdiq
- Camp Christian → Ezzhiliga
- Xauen → Chefchaouen
- Camp Boulhaut → Benslimane
- Camp Monod → Sidi Allal El Bahraoui
- Kebdana → Cabo de Agua → Cap de l’Eau → Ras El Ma

== Myanmar ==
In many cases, the English name of the city changed due to different romanization systems, while the Burmese native remained unchanged.

- Arakan → Rakhine
- Akyab → Sittwe
- Amherst → Kyaikkami
- Bassein → Pathein
- Henzada → Hinthada
- Maymyo → Pyin U Lwin
- Moulmein → Mawlamyaing
- Mergui → Myeik
- Myohaung → Mrauk U
- Pagan → Bagan
- Pegu → Bago
- Prome → Pyay
- Dagon → Rangoon → Yangon
- Sandoway → Thandwe
- Syriam → Thanlyin
- Karen → Kayin
- Tavoy → Dawei
- Tenasserim → Tanintharyi
- Yaunghwe → Nyaung Shwe

== Netherlands ==
- Coriovallum (possible misspelling of Cortovallum) → Heerlen
- Kuilenburg → Culemborg
- Noviomagus Batavorum (or Batavodurum) → Nimwegen → Nijmegen
- Traiectum → Traiectum ad Mosam → Maastricht
- Traiectum → Ultra Traiectum → Utrecht
- Forum Hadriani → Voorburg
- Zwaagwesteinde → De Westereen
- Tergouw → Gouda

== North Korea ==
- Sinuiju → Shingishū† → Sinuiju
- Wanggeom-seong → Pyongyang → Seogyeong → Pyongyang → Heijō† → Pyongyang
- Wonsanjin → Genzan† → Wonsan
- Songjin → Kimchaek (1952)
- Songrim → Genjihō (1916) → Songrim (1945)

†Japanese name during Korea under Japanese rule (1910–1945). The Korean name is unchanged.

== North Macedonia ==
- Veles → Titov Veles →Veles, North Macedonia

== Norway ==
- Ánslo → Christiania (1624) → Oslo (1925)
- Kaupangen → Nidaros → Trondhjem → Nidaros → Trondheim
- Fredrikshald → Halden
- Bjørgvin → Bergen

== Peru ==
- Ciudad de los Reyes → Lima
- San Pablo de Napeanos → Iquitos

== Paraguay ==
- Puerto Flor de Lis → Puerto Presidente Stroessner → Ciudad del Este
- Ajos → Coronel Oviedo

== Poland ==
- Aleksandrowo → Aleksandrów Pograniczny → Aleksandrów Kujawski
- Jędrzychów → Andrzychów → Andrychów
- Barcino → Barcin
- Wartberge → Wartenburg → Nowowiejsk^{2} → Barczewo
- Brido → Wartha → Bardo
- Neu Berlin → Berlinchen → Barlinek
- Rosenthal → Bartenstein → Bartoszyce
- Barwica → Bärwalde^{1} → Barwice^{2}
- Biała → Zülz^{1} → Biała^{2}
- Gajle → Biała → Gehlen^{1} → Gehlenburg → Biała Piska^{2}
- Brzegi → Białe Brzegi → Białobrzegi
- Biały Bór → Baldenburg^{1} → Biały Bór^{2}
- Bielszczany Stok → Białystok
- Biała → Langenbielau^{1} → Bielawa^{2}
- Lignica → Fürstenwald^{1} → Beroldestadt → Bernstadt → Bierutów^{2}
- Bischofsburg → Biskupiec^{2}
- Strowangen → Bischofstein → Bistein → Bisztynek^{2}
- Błaszkowice → Błaszki
- Richnow → Reichenau^{1} → Rychwałd^{2} → Bogatynia
- Gross-Born → Borne Sulinowo^{2}
- Brusseberge → Brunsberg → Braunsberg → Braniewo^{2}
- Brwinowo → Brwinów
- Wysoki Brzeg → Brieg^{1} → Brzeg^{2}
- Brzeg → Dyhernfurth → Brzeg Dolny^{2}
- Busk → Busko → Busko Zdrój
- Bydgoszcz → Bromberg → Bydgoszcz^{2} → Bromberg → Bydgoszcz^{2}
- Bystrzyce → Habelschwerdt^{1} → Bystrzyca Kłodzka
- Bytom → Beuthen an der Oder^{1} → Białobrzezie^{2} → Bytom Odrzański
- Łoza → Kulmsee^{1} → Chełmża^{2}
- Freienwalde → Chociwel^{2}
- Konice → Konigesberge^{1} → Königsberg in der Neumark → Chojna^{2}
- Chorzów → Königshütte^{1} → Chorzów^{2}
- Arnswalde → Choszczno^{2}
- Tempelburg → Czaplinek^{2}
- Czarne → Hammerstein^{1} → Czarne^{2} → Hammerstein^{1} → Czarne^{2}
- Rothenburg → Czerwieńsk^{2}
- Dęblin → Ivanogród (1840) → Dęblin (1920)
- Dzierzgoń → Neu Christburg^{1} → Christburg → Dzierzgoń^{2}
- Reichenbach → Dzierżoniów^{2}
- Łęg → Lyck → Ełk^{2}
- Gdynia → Gdingen → Gdynia → Gotenhafen → Gdynia^{2}
- Gdańsk → Danzig → Gdańsk^{2}
- Nowa Wieś → Lötzen → Giżycko^{2}
- Głogów → Glogau → Głogów^{2}
- Landsberg → Landsberg an der Warthe → Gorzów Wielkopolski^{2}
- Nowy Włodzisław → Junowłodzisław → Inowłodzisław → Inowłocław → Inowrocław → Hohensalza → Inowrocław → Hohensalza → Inowrocław
- Biała → Janów → Janów Lubelski
- Jastrow → Jastrowie
- Hirschberg → Jelenia Góra^{2}
- Kattowitz → Katowice → Stalinogród (1953) → Katowice (1956)
- Wietrzna Góra → Kazimierz → Kazimierz Dolny
- Rast → Rastenburg → Rastembork → Kętrzyn
- Kladsko → Glatz → Kłodzko
- Kołobrzeg → Kolberg → Kołobrzeg^{2}
- Koszalin → Köslin → Koszalin^{2}
- Hurthland → Friedland → Korfantów^{2}
- Lignica → Liegnitz^{1} → Legnica^{2}
- Łódź → Lodsch → Łódź^{1}→ Litzmannstadt → Łódź^{2}
- Lubin → Lüben^{1} → Lubin^{2}
- Marienburg → Malbork → Marienburg → Malbork^{2}
- Berenwalde → Bärwalde → Mieszkowice^{2}
- Mieńsk → Mińsk → Nowomińsk → Mińsk Mazowiecki
- Sensburg → Mrągowo
- Florianów → Narol
- Nowe Miasto Korczyn → Nowy Korczyn
- Margrabowa → Treuburg^{1} → Olecko^{2}
- Pazluk → Hollandt^{1} → Preußisch Holland → Pasłęk^{2}
- Piasek → Piaski Luterskie → Piaski
- Melcekuke → Mehlsack → Pieniężno^{2}
- Pisz → Johannisburg^{1} → Pisz^{2}
- Przemków → Primkenow^{1} → Primkenau^{1} → Przemków^{2}
- Puławy → Nowa Aleksandria → Puławy
- Prudnik → Neustadt → Prądnik^{2} → Prudnik
- Słupsk → Stolp^{1} → Słupsk^{2}
- Stargard Szczeciński → Stargard (2016)
- Stettin → Szczecin^{2}
- Ortulfsburg → Ortelsburg → Szczytno^{2}
- Rogoźno → Jelitowo → Tomaszów → Tomaszów Lubelski
- Waldenberg → Waldenburg → Wałbrzych^{2}
- Wejherowska Wola → Neustadt^{1} → Wejherowo → Neustadt^{1} → Wejherowo
- Wielka Wieś → Władysławowo
- Włodzisław → Włocław → Leslau → Włocławek → Leslau → Włocławek^{2}
- Wrocisław → Wrocław → Preßlau → Breslau → Wrocław^{2}
- Zabrze → Hindenburg (1915) → Zabrze^{2}
- Zawadzki → Andreashütte^{1} → Zawadzkie^{2}
- Frankenstein → Ząbkowice Śląskie^{2}
- Zielona Góra → Grünberg^{1} → Zielona Góra^{2}

^{1} Cities in western Poland whose names were changed when Poland gained independence from Germany in 1918.
^{2} German cities from 1918 to 1939 that became part of Poland after 1945.

== Portugal ==
- Aeminium → Coimbra
- Bracara Augusta → Braga
- Conimbriga → Condeixa-a-Nova (Coimbra)
- Iebora → Évora
- Olisipo → Al-Usbuna → Lisbon (Lisboa)
- Pax Iulia → Beja
- Portus Cale → Porto (Oporto) and Vila Nova de Gaia
- Sheberina → Serpa
- Sintara → Sintra
- Villa Euracini (953) → Villa Verazin (1198) → Póvoa de Varzim (1308)

== Serbia ==
- Caribrod → Dimitrovgrad
- Despotovica → Gornji Milanovac
- Horreum Margi → Ravno → Ćuprija
- Jagodina → Svetozarevo → Jagodina
- Karanovac → Kraljevo → Rankovićevo → Kraljevo
- Nagy Bécskerek/Veliki Bečkerek → Bečkerek → Petrovgrad → Zrenjanin
- Petrovaradinski Šanac → Novi Sad
- Poreč → Donji Milanovac
- Singidon → Singidunum → Bělgradъ (Бѣлъградъ) → Nándorfehérvár → Dar-ul-Cihad → Beograd (Belgrade)
- Taurunum → Zemun
- Sirmium → Sremska Mitrovica
- Užice → Titovo Užice (1946) → Užice (1992)
- Vrbas → Titov Vrbas (1983) → Vrbas (1992)
- Zanes → Pontes → Diana → Novi Grad → Fetislam → Kladovo
- Zaslon → Šabac

== Seychelles ==
- L'Établissement → Victoria

== Singapore ==
- Bukit Panjang → Zhenghua → Bukit Panjang
- Chan Chu Kang → Nee Soon → Yishun†
- Kalang → Kallang
- Kang Kar → Sengkang
- Passier Reis → Pasir Ris
- Peck San → Bishan†
- Pongal → Ponggol → Punggol
- Temasek → Singapore
- Westhill → Chong Pang

Name change in English due to replacement of older romanization methods with the pinyin system. The Chinese name is unchanged.

== Slovakia ==
- Šafaríkovo → Tornaľa
- Šimonovany → Baťovany → Partizánske
- Besztercebánya → Banská Bystrica
- Kaschau, Kassa → Košice
- Pressburg, Pozsony → Bratislava

== Slovenia ==
- Assling → Jesenice
- Bischofslack → Škofja Loka
- Celeia → Cilli → Celje
- Egida → Capris → Justinopolis → Caput Histriae → Koper/Capodistria
- Emona → Laibach → Ljubljana
- Marburg → Maribor
- Poetovio → Pettau → Ptuj
- Pirano → Piran
- Capodistria → Koper
- Portorose → Portorož
- Velenje → Titovo Velenje (1981) → Velenje (1991)
- Castra ad Fluvio Frigido → Ajdovščina
- Atrans → Trojane

== South Korea ==
- Cheju (1397) → Jeju‡
- Dalgubeol → Taegu (757 AD) → Daegu‡
- Dongrae (before 1914) → Fusan (1914) → Pusan† (1945) → Busan‡
- Duingji-hyeon → Yŏn'gi → Yeongi‡ → Sejong (2012)
- Usisan → Uhwa → Heungrye-bu → Gonghwa-hyeon → Ulju (1018 AD) → Ulsan (1413)
- Hanbat → Taejŏn → Daejeon‡
- Mujin → Muju → Kwangju → Gwangju‡
- Hansanju → Hanyang → Hanseong → Gyeongseong/Keijō (1910) → Seoul (1945)
- Michuhol → Soseong-hyeon → Gyeongwon-bu → Inch'ŏn (1413) → Jinsen† (1910) → Chemulpo (1945)→ Inch'ŏn (1945) → Incheon‡
- Ungjin → Kongju → Gongju‡
- Silchon-eup → Gonjiam-eup (Gwangju, Gyeonggi) (2011)
- Doam-myeon → Daegwallyeong-myeon (Pyeongchang) (2007)

†Japanese name during Korea under Japanese rule (1910–1945). The Korean name is unchanged.
‡Name change in English due to replacement McCune–Reischauer with the Revised Romanization method in 2000. The Korean name is unchanged.

== Spain ==
- Acci → Guadix
- Adobrica → Ferrol → Ferrol del Caudillo (1938) → Ferrol (1982)
- Azaña → Numancia de la Sagra (1936)
- Barcino → Barcino Nova → Barcelona
- Basti → Baza
- Bayona de Tajuña → Titulcia
- Brigantium → Caronium → Corunna → La Coruña → A Coruña
- Caesaraugusta → Zaragoza
- Colonia Iulia Romula → Hispalis → Ishbiliya → Seville (Sevilla)
- Colonia Norba Caesarina → Norba → Cáceres
- Colonia Patricia → Corduba → Qurtuba → Córdoba
- Complutum → Alcalá de Henares
- Egara → Terrassa
- Gasteiz → Nueva Victoria → Vitoria-Gasteiz
- Guernica → Guernica y Luno → Gernika-Lumo
- Iulia Traducta → Algeciras
- Lucentum → Alicante
- Malaca → Málaga
- Onuba → Huelva
- Sos → Sos del Rey Católico
- Villa Real → Ciudad Real

== Sweden ==
- Bogesund → Ulricehamn
- Bro → Christinehamn → Kristinehamn
- Malmhaugar → Malmö
- Tuna → Eskilstuna → Carl Gustafs Stad → Eskilstuna
- Westra Aros → Wæstaros → Västerås
- Östra Aros → Upsala → Uppsala

== Switzerland ==
- Aarmühle → Interlaken
- Augusta Raurica → Kaiseraugst
- Aventicum → Wiflispurg → Avenches
- Eburodunum → Yverdon-les-Bains
- Lousonna → Lausanne
- Minnodunum → Moudon
- Octodurus → Martigny
- Turicum → Zürich

== Syria ==
- Beroea → Aleppo
- Balanea (Greek, Latin) → Baniyas (Arabic)
- Emesa → Homs
- (H)Amat(h)(a) (Aramaic, Assyrian) → Epiphania → Epiphania, Emath(oùs) (Greek) → Hamath → Hama
- Laodicea ad Mare → Latakia
- Palmyra → Tadmor
- Rasaappa, Rasappa, Rasapi (Akadian) → Sergiopolis → Anastasiopolis (Greek, Latin) → Risapa, Rosafa (Latin) → Resafa (Arabic)

== Taiwan ==
- Quemoy → Kinmen
- Tamsui → Danshui → Tamsui
- Sindian† → Xindian

†Chinese name unchanged.

== Tanzania ==
- Bismarckburg → Kasanga
- Tabora → Weidmannsheil → Tabora

== Thailand ==
- Ayothaya → Ayutthaya (1237)
- Bangkok → Phra Nakhon (1782) → Krung Thep (1972)
- Trat → Trach → Trat (1906)

== United Kingdom ==
=== England ===
- Monkchester → Newcastle upon Tyne (1080s)
- Lyme → Lyme Regis (1284)
- Beeston → Beeston Regis (1399)
- Lynn → King's Lynn (16th century)
- Leamington Priors → Royal Leamington Spa (1838)
- Cambridge Town → Camberley (1877)
- Tunbridge Wells → Royal Tunbridge Wells (1909)
- Bognor → Bognor Regis (1929)
- Piddletown → Puddletown (late 1950s)
- Wootton Bassett → Royal Wootton Bassett (2011)
- Staines → Staines-upon-Thames (2012)

=== Scotland ===
- Ardencaple → Helensburgh
- Cadȝow → Hamilton (15th century)
- Cartleyhole, Clarty Hole → Abbotsford
- Conveth → Laurencekirk
- Dunedin (and variants) → Edinburgh
- Friock → Friockheim
- Hamnavoe → Stromness
- Kiliwhimin → Fort Augustus (18th century)
- Kilrule, Kilrymont → St Andrews
- Kilbride → West Kilbride (early 18th century)
- Kilbride → East Kilbride (early 18th century)
- Maryburgh → Gordonsburgh → Duncansburgh → Fort William
- Navermouth (Am Blàran Odhar) → Bettyhill
- Newark → Port Glasgow (1775)
- Obbe → Leverburgh (1920)
- St John's Toun, St Johnstone → Perth
- Milton of Strathbogie → Huntly
- Vale of Leven → Alexandria

=== Northern Ireland ===
- Ballinascreen → Draperstown (1818)
- Cromlin → Hillsborough (1661) → Royal Hillsborough (2021)
- Derry → Londonderry (1613) (Note: The renaming remains contentious, and is subject to a naming dispute to the present day.)
- Legacorry → Richhill (c. 1760)
- Lisnagarvy → Lisburn (1662)
- Muff → Eglinton (1858)

== United States ==
=== Alabama ===
- Clarence → Susan Moore
- Ear Gap → Gu-Win
- Friendship → Pine Apple
- Jones Mill → Roy → Jones Mill → Frisco City
- Mt. Zion → Section

=== Alaska ===
- Barrow → Utqiaġvik
- Novoarkhangelsk → Sitka
- Paul's Harbor (Pavlovskaya Gavan) → Kodiak
- Rockwell → Harrisburg → Juneau
- Shungnak → Kobuk
- Warton → Palmer
- West Petersburg → Kupreanof
- Yutica → Deering

=== Arizona ===
- Green Valley → Payson
- Rittenhouse → Queen Creek
- Smithville → Pima
- Swilling's Mill → Helling's Mill → Mill City → East Phoenix → Phoenix

=== Arkansas ===
- Alpena Pass → Alpena
- Chactas Prairie → Russellville
- Haddoxburg → London
- Lone Oak → Lonoke
- Scott's Prairie → Green Forest
- Wiley's Cove → Leslie
- Vilsonia → Vilonia

=== California ===
- Baden → South San Francisco
- Bakersville → Waterford
- El Toro → Lake Forest
- Grover City → Grover Beach
- Nordoff → Ojai
- Todos Santos → Concord
- Tuleburg → Stockton
- Wineville → Mira Loma
- Yerba Buena → San Francisco

=== Colorado ===
- Fletcher → Aurora
- Union Colony → Greeley
- Mayfield → Peyton

=== Connecticut ===
- Amity → Woodbridge
- Bantam → Litchfield
- Columbia Parish → Prospect
- Conway → Portland
- Coram → Ripton → Huntington → Shelton
- East Middletown → Chatham → East Hampton
- East Saybrook → Lyme
- Farmingbury → Wolcott
- Fort Hoop → Newtowne → Hartford
- Freshwater Plantation → Enfield
- Hartford Mountains → Bolton
- Iron Works Village → East Haven
- Judds Meadow → Salem Bridge → Naugatuck
- Kensington → Berlin
- Lebanon Crank → Columbia
- Mast Swamp → Torrington
- Mattianuck → Dorchester → Windsor
- Mettabasett → Middletown
- Middlesex Parish → Darien
- Mortlake → Brooklyn
- New Cambridge → Bristol
- New Cheshire Parish → Cheshire
- New Concord → Bozrah
- Newbury → Brookfield
- New Scituate → Ashford
- Northbury → Plymouth
- Northington → Avon
- North Stratford → Trumbull
- Orford Parish → Manchester
- Pahquioque (Paquiack) → Swampfield → Danbury
- Pequonnock → Bridgeport
- Pomperaug Plantation → Woodbury
- Ponde Town → Mansfield
- Pyquag → Wethersfield
- Quanneapague → Newtown
- Rimmon → Chusetown → Humphreysville → Seymour
- Rippowam → Stamford
- Saybrooke Colony → Saybrook → Deep River
- Shepaug → Roxbury
- Southfield → Suthfield → Suffield
- South Lyme → Old Lyme
- Stepney Parish → Rocky Hill
- Totoket → Branford
- Unquowa → Fairfield
- Upper Middletown → Cromwell
- Wallup → East Enfield → Somers
- Wepawaug → Milford
- West Farms → Franklin
- Wintonbury → Bloomfield

=== Delaware ===
- Fort Casimir → Fort Trefaldighet → New Amstel → New Castle
- Fort Christina → Fort Altena → Wilmington
- Zwaanendael → Lewes

=== Florida ===
- Alligator → Lake City
- Jernigan → Orlando
- Lake Worth → Lake Worth Beach
- Saint Petersburg Beach → St. Pete Beach
- Survey → Bonita Springs

=== Georgia ===
- Anderson → Andersonville
- Berlin → Lens → Berlin
- Berrien → Drayton → Vienna
- Dawsonville → Calhoun
- Doe Run → Tunnelsville → Tunnel Hill
- Dublin → Resaca
- Dykesboro → Cochran
- Haistentown → Sharon Grove → Brooks
- Handtown → Hazlehurst
- Kestler → Damascus
- Lawrence → Lake Park
- Levison → Eastman
- Marion → Ashburn
- Midway → Lilly
- Plains of Dura → Plains
- Puddleville → Adel
- Sharpe's Store → Morven
- Surrey → Omega
- Terminus → Marthasville → Atlanta
- Tobanana → Georgetown

=== Hawaii ===
- Makaweli → Kaumakani

=== Idaho ===
- Desmet → Tensed
- Eagle Rock → Idaho Falls
- Market Lake → Roberts

=== Illinois ===
- Alcoa → Alorton — in St. Clair County
- Allin → Stanford — in McLean County
- Amity → Pocohontas — in Bond County; name also used for an old plat in Cornell, Livingston County
- Ardmore → Villa Park — in DuPage County
- Area → Mundelein — in Lake County
- Athens → New Athens — in St. Clair County; name now used by Athens, Menard County
- Baden → New Baden — in Clinton and St. Clair counties
- Beechwood → Mounds — in Pulaski County
- Benton → Williamsville — in Sangamon County
- Berrian → Kewanee — in Henry County
- Blackberry → Elburn — in Kane County
- Bolton → Stonefort — in Saline and Williamson counties
- Bowensburg → Bowen — in Hancock County
- Bradly City → Bradley — in Kankakee County
- Bristol Station → Bristol — in Kendall County; name formerly used by northern portion of Yorkville, Kendall County
- Butler → Cherry Valley — in Winnebago County; name now used by Butler, Montgomery County
- Camden → Lincoln — in Logan County; name now used by Camden, Schuyler County
- Camden Mills → Milan — in Rock Island County
- Centerville → Cuba — in Fulton County; name also used for several other settlements named Centerville
- Centerville → Millstadt — in St. Clair County; name also used for several other settlements named Centerville
- Centerville → Ripley — in Brown County; name also used for several other settlements named Centerville
- Centerville → Woodstock — in McHenry County; name also used for several other settlements named Centerville
- Charleston → Brimfield — in Peoria County; name now used by Charleston, Coles County
- Charleston → St. Charles — in DuPage and Kane counties; name now used by Charleston, Coles County
- Charleston → St. Charles — in Kane and DuPage counties; name now used by Charleston, Coles County
- Chatham → Sterling — in Whiteside County; name now used by Chatham, Sangamon County
- Chillicothe → Indianola — in Vermilion County; name now used by Chillicothe, Peoria County
- Clarkesville or Clarksville → Sciota — in McDonough County; name also used for unincorporated Clarksville, Coles County
- Clement → Huey — in Clinton County
- Clintonville → South Elgin — in Kane County
- Coloma → Du Bois — in Washington County
- Concord → Danvers — in McLean County; name now used by Concord, Morgan County
- Crescent → Crescent City — in Iroquois County
- Crotty → Seneca — in Grundy and LaSalle counties
- Dallas → Indianola — in Vermilion County
- Dement → Creston — in Ogle County
- Dunleith → East Dubuque — in Jo Daviess County
- East Chicago Heights → Ford Heights — in Cook County
- East Wood River → Wood River — in Madison County
- Elk Hart City → Elkhart — in Logan County
- Ellsworth → Lostant — in LaSalle County; name now used by Ellsworth, McLean County
- Elyda → Winnebago — in Winnebago County
- Emporium City → Mound City — in Pulaski County
- Fairfield → Mendon — in Adams County; name now used by Fairfield, Wayne County
- Fairfield → Pleasant Hill — in Pike County; name now used by Fairfield, Wayne County
- Florence → Oregon — in Ogle County; name now used by Florence, Pike County
- Fordville → Energy — in Williamson County
- Fordyce → Gorham — in Jackson County
- Fort Dearborn → Chicago
- Ft. Sheridan → Highwood — in Lake County
- Georgetown → Newark — in Kendall County; name now used by Georgetown, Vermilion County
- Georgetown → Steeleville — in Randolph County; name now used by Georgetown, Vermilion County
- Glascoe → Glasford — in Peoria County
- Glendale → Glendale Heights — in DuPage County; name also used for unincorporated Glendale, Pope County
- Grand Cote → Coulterville — in Randolph County
- Greenfield → LaMoille — in Bureau County; name now used by Greenfield, Greene County
- Grossdale → Brookfield — in Cook County
- Halidayburg → Kane — in Greene County
- Hanover → Metamora — in Woodford County; name now used by Hanover, Jo Daviess County
- Harlem → Forest Park — in Cook County; name also used for unincorporated Harlem, Winnebago County
- Harrison → Cedarville — in Stephenson County; name also used for two unincorporated places named Harrison
- Harvester → Burr Ridge — in DuPage County
- Henderson → Knoxville — in Knox Township, Knox County east of Galesburg; name now used by nearby Henderson, Henderson Township, Knox County north of Galesburg
- Hilton → East Peoria — in Tazewell County
- Howard → Durand — in Winnebago County
- Howlet → Riverton — in Sangamon County
- Humphrey → Tovey — in Christian County
- Huston → Mulberry Grove — in Bond County
- Illinoistown → East St. Louis — in St. Clair County
- Independence → Oakland — in Coles County
- Indiantown → Tiskilwa — in Bureau County
- Jamestown → Riverton — in Sangamon County; name also used for unincorporated Jamestown, Clinton County
- Juliet → Joliet — in Will County
- Keokuk Junction → Golden — in Adams County
- Lane → Rochelle — in Ogle County; name also used for unincorporated Lane, DeWitt County
- Lapier → Altona — in Knox County
- Laurel Hill → Table Grove — in Fulton County
- Liberty → Burnt Prairie — in White County; name now used by Liberty, Adams County
- Liberty → Rockwood — in Randolph County; name now used by other Liberty, Adams County
- Little Fort → Waukegan — in Lake County
- Lodi → Maple Park — in Kane County; also other communities formerly named Lodi
- Lysander → Pecatonica — in Winnebago County
- Mantua → Washburn — in Woodford County
- Marysville → Potomac — in Vermilion County
- Mechanicsburg → Mascoutah — in St. Clair County; name now used by Mechanicsburg, Sangamon County
- Melrose → Melrose Park — in Cook County; name also used for unincorporated Melrose, Clark County
- Middleton → Iuka — in Marion County
- Midway → Kansas — in Edgar County; name also used for several unincorporated places named Midway
- Mill Creek → Old Mill Creek — in Lake County; name now used by Mill Creek, Union County
- Millersburg → Pierron — in Bond and Madison counties; name also used for unincorporated Millersburg, Mercer County
- Milton → Humboldt — in Coles County; name now used by Milton, Pike County
- Monsanto → Sauget — in St. Clair County
- Morristown → New Milford — in Winnebago County
- Mt. Pleasant → Farmer City — in DeWitt County
- New Liberty → Willow Hill — in Jasper County; name now used by New Liberty, Pope County
- New Rutland → Rutland — in LaSalle County
- New Salem → West Salem — in Edwards County; also the name of several unincorporated places named New Salem
- Niles Centre → Skokie — in Cook County
- North Bloomington → Normal — in McLean County
- Oak Grove → Green Oaks — in Lake County; name now used by Oak Grove, Rock Island County
- Oak Grove Park → Germantown Hills — in Woodford County
- Oak Grove Park → Oak Grove — in Rock Island County
- Oakbrook → Oak Brook — in DuPage County
- Ogle Station → Ashton — in Lee County
- Park Forest South → University Park — in Cook and Will counties
- Pecatonica → Rockton — in Rockton Township, Winnebago County; name now used by Pecatonica, Pecatonica Township, Winnebago County
- Pembroke → Hopkins Park — in Kankakee County
- Planefield → Plainfield — in Kendall and Will Counties
- Pleasantville → Ipava — in Fulton County
- Portland → Blue Island — in Cook County
- Portland → Oglesby — in LaSalle County
- Postville → Lincoln — in Logan County
- Prairie City → Toledo — in Cumberland County; name now used by Prairie City, McDonough County
- Prospect Park → Glen Ellyn — in DuPage County
- Rand → Des Plaines — in Cook County
- Randall → East Galesburg — in Knox County
- Rantoul → Alma — in Marion County; name now used by Rantoul, Champaign County
- Reeves → Cambria — in Williamson County
- Richmond → Richview — in Washington County; name now used by Richmond, McHenry County
- Ridgeville → Evanston — in Cook County
- Rome → Dix — in Jefferson County; name also used for unincorporated Rome, Peoria County
- Rose Clare → Rosiclare — in Hardin County
- Saline → Grantfork — in Madison County
- Schaumburg Center → Schaumburg — in Cook County
- Sheridan → Good Hope — in McDonough County; name now used by Sheridan, LaSalle County
- Shermerville → Northbrook — in Cook County
- South Pass → Cobden — in Union County
- Specialville → Dixmoor — in Cook County
- Spring Forest → Willow Springs — in Cook and DuPage counties
- St. Marye → Beaverville — in Iroquois County
- Stephenson → Rock Island — in Rock Island County
- Sunnyside → Johnsburg — in McHenry County
- Sunrise Ridge → Wonder Lake — in McHenry County
- Sutton → Bentley — in Hancock County; name also used for unincorporated Sutton, Cook County
- Tazewell → Spring Bay — in Woodford County
- Tessville → Lincolnwood — in Cook County
- Troy → Shorewood — in Will County; name also used by Troy, Madison County
- Turner → West Chicago — in DuPage County
- Uniontown → Washburn — in Woodford County; name also used for unincorporated Uniontown, Knox County
- Urbana → Freeburg — in St. Clair County; name now used by Urbana, Champaign County
- Utopia → Oakbrook Terrace — in DuPage County
- Van Buren → St. Francisville — in Lawrence County
- Victoria → Phillipstown — in White County; name now used by Victoria, Knox County
- Vienna → Astoria — in Fulton County; name now used by Vienna, Johnson County
- Waldron → Aroma Park — in Kankakee County
- Walnut Grove → Altona — in Knox County; name also used for unincorporated places named Walnut Grove
- Wappello → Hanover — in Jo Daviess County
- Wau-Bun → Northfield — in Cook County
- West Hammond → Calumet City — in Cook County
- Westhaven → Orland Hills — in Cook County
- Whitfield → Leland — in LaSalle County
- Wilson → Illiopolis — in Sangamon County; name also used for unincorporated Wilson, Lake County
- Winchester → Wilmington — in Will County; name now used by Winchester, Scott County
- Windsor → Tiskilwa — in Bureau County; name now used by Windsor, Shelby County and as the usual name for legal New Windsor, Mercer County
- Wiona → Malden — in Bureau County
- Worcester → Barry — in Pike County
- Xenia → Atlanta — in Logan County; name now used by Xenia, Clay County
- Yellow Creek → Pearl City — in Loran Township, Stephenson County; name also used for nearby unincorporated Yellow Creek, Kent Township, Stephenson County
- York → Thomson — in Carroll County; name also used for unincorporated York, Clark County
- Young America → Kirkwood — in Warren County

=== Iowa ===
- Columbus → Cedar Rapids
- Kanesville → Council Bluffs
- Springfield → Maquoketa

=== Kentucky ===
- Minor Lane Heights → Heritage Creek

=== Louisiana ===
- Vermilionville → Lafayette

=== Maine ===
- Adams → Crawford
- Agamenticus → Bristol → Gorgeana → York
- Alva → Blaine
- Ashland → Dalton → Ashland
- Blaisdelltown → Exeter
- Bridge's Plantation → Town of Kingville → Joy → Montgomery → Troy
- Cape Porpus → Arundel → Kennebunk Port → North Kennebunkport → Arundel
- Cold Stream → Enfield
- Collegetown → Dixmont
- Crosbytown → Etna
- Davistown Plantation → Montville
- Dunntown → Wade
- Dutton → Glenburn
- East Pond Plantation → Newport
- Elkinstown → Dexter
- Fairbanks → Presque Isle
- Fremont Plantation → Easton
- Green Plantation → Belmont
- Howard → Willimantic
- Hubbardstown → Shapleigh
- Hurd's Ridge → Burlington
- Jackson → Kirkland → Hudson
- Kenduskeag Plantation → Bangor
- Kittery Commons → North Berwick
- Kittery North Parish → Berwick
- Lincoln → Garland
- Malta → Gerry → Windsor
- Mansel → Tremont
- Mattekeunk → Lee
- Newichawannock → South Berwick
- Newport Plantation → Blue Hill
- New Worcester → Orrington → Brewer
- Ohio → Corinth
- Orangetown → Whiting
- Pannawambskek → Old Town
- Parsonstown Plantation → Parsonsfield
- Pepperellborough → Saco
- Pennamaquan → Pembroke
- Penobscot Island → Orphan Island → Wetmore Isle → Verona → Verona Island
- Phillipstown → Sanford
- Piscataqua Plantation → Kittery
- Pitaubegwimenahanuk → Long Island Plantation → Islesboro
- Pleasant Ridge Plantation → Caswell
- Plymouth Gore → Sebasticook Plantation → Warsaw → Pittsfield
- Quantabacook → Fraternity Village → Searsmont
- Smithstown Plantation → Beaver Hill Plantation → Freedom
- Stockton → Stockton Springs
- Sunkhaze → Milford
- Swanfield → Lyman
- T2 R5 NWP → New Charleston → Charleston
- T4 R4 NWP → Corinna
- Towwoh Plantation → Lebanon
- Twenty-Five Mile Pond Plantation → Unity
- Washington Plantation → Newfield
- Webhannet → Wells
- Wellington Township → Monticello
- Wheelersborough → Hampden

=== Maryland ===
- Caiuctucuc → Wills Creek → Cumberland
- Eel Town → Hawkins Merry-Peep-O-Day → Berlin → Barry → Brunswick
- Elizabeth Town → Hagerstown
- Germantown → Perry Hall
- Head of Elk → Elkton
- Mechanicstown → Thurmont
- Newtown → Leonardtown
- Providence → Anne Arundel Towne → Annapolis
- Riverdale → Riverdale Park
- Silver Fancy → Poplar Fields → Emmitsburg
- Winchester → Westminster

=== Massachusetts ===
- Agawam Plantation → Springfield
- Cold Spring → Belcher's Town → Belchertown
- Dale of Hope → Hopedale
- Fall River → Troy → Fall River
- Gay Head → Aquinnah
- Glasgow → Blandford
- Ireland Parish → Ireland → Holyoke
- Manchester → Manchester-by-the-Sea
- Marlbury → Marlborough
- Menotomy → Arlington
- Minnechaug → South Wilbraham → Hampden
- Quaboage → Quaboag → Brookfield
- Shawmut → Boston
- Stony Hill → Ludlow

=== Michigan ===
- Avon Township → Rochester Hills, Michigan
- Berlin → Marne
- Bronson → Kalamazoo
- East Detroit → Eastpointe
- Fort Pontchartrain du Détroit → Detroit
- Harlow → Hog's Hallow → McDouglasville → Utica
- Jefferson → Sterling Heights
- Swainsville → Brooklyn

=== Minnesota ===
- Imnizaska → Pig's Eye → St. Paul

=== Mississippi ===
- Alexandria → Quito

=== Missouri ===
- Smith's Landing → Saint Aubert → Mokane

=== Nebraska ===
- Lancaster → Lincoln

=== Nevada ===
- Horn Silver → Hornsilver → Goldpoint → Gold Point

=== New Hampshire ===
- Derryfield → Manchester
- Hilton's Pointe → Cochecho → Northam → Dover
- Nashuway → Nashville → Nashua
- Number Two → Middle Monadnock → Monadnock → Jaffrey
- Nutfield → Londonderry
- Plantation of Penney Cook → Penney Cook → Pennacook → Rumford → Concord
- Piscatiqua → Strawberry Hill → Portsmouth
- Suncook → Pembroke
- Winnacunnet → Hampton

=== New Jersey ===
- Acquackanonk → Clifton
- Awiehawken → Weehawken
- Bergen → Jersey City
- Boiling Springs Township → East Rutherford
- Delford → Oradell
- East Paterson → Elmwood Park
- Fort Nassau → Gloucester City
- Hunt's Mills → Clinton
- Madison Township (Middlesex County) → Old Bridge Township
- Maidenhead Township → Lawrence Township
- Matawan Township → Aberdeen
- Nya Stockholm → Bridgeport
- Passaic Township → Long Hill Township
- Raritan Township (Monmouth County) → Hazlet
- Second River → Belleville
- Sodon → Glen Gardner
- South Orange Township → Maplewood
- Sveaborg → Swedesboro
- Turkey or Turkey Town → New Providence
- Washington Township → Robbinsville Township
- West Paterson → Woodland Park
- Delaware Township → Cherry Hill Township

=== New Mexico ===
- Alburquerque → Albuquerque
- Hot Springs → Truth or Consequences

=== New York ===
- Amapaugh → Somers
- Beverwijck → Albany
- Bloomfield → East Bloomfield
- Breuckelen → Brooklyn (borough of New York City)
- Canton → Cairo
- Town of Charleston → Lima
- Chepontuc → Wing's Falls → Glens Falls
- Clinton → East Greenbush
- Despatch → East Rochester
- Duanes' Bush → Duanesburg
- Easton → Lincoln → Gorham
- Fairfield → Luzerne → Lake Luzerne
- Farwell's Mills → Clarendon
- Fort Nassau → Fort Orange → Albany → Willemstad → Albany
- Town of Franklin → Patterson
- Town of Frederick → Kent (Putnam County)
- Freedom → LaGrange
- Freehold → Durham
- Gerrysville → Alabama
- Granger → Taghkanic
- Great Imboght District → Catskill
- Heemstede → Hempstead
- Huntington South → New Babylon → Babylon
- Iverness → Wheatland
- King's District → Canaan
- Kiryas Joel → Palm Tree
- Mahackamack → Port Jervis
- Middletown → South Middletown → Middletown
- Milton → Genoa
- New Amsterdam → New York → New Orange → New York City
- New Cornwall → Cornwall
- Northampton → Town of Southampton → Caledonia
- Northfield → Edinburg
- North Tarrytown → Sleepy Hollow
- Oak Orchard → Carlton
- Plain Brook → Oakfield
- Setauket → Brookhaven
- Sing Sing → Ossining
- South Bay → Dresden (Washington County)
- South Pembroke → Darien
- Staaten Eylandt → Staten Island (borough of New York City)
- Stoutenburgh → Hyde Park
- Town of Union → Hamlin
- Vera Cruz → New Haven
- Watkinson → Middletown → Naples
- Town of Westfield → Fort Ann
- Wiltwyck → Kingston
- Yennicott → Southold

=== North Carolina ===
- Atkins Bank → Kingston → Kinston → Caswel → Kinston
- Campbellton + Cross Creek → Fayetteville
- Fuquay Springs and Varina → Fuquay-Varina
- Pacific → Youngsville (1875)
- Wachau → Salem → Winston-Salem

=== North Dakota ===
No places in North Dakota have been renamed.

=== Ohio ===
- Cleaveland → Cleveland
- Gamble's Mill → Shelby
- Losantiville → Cincinnati
- Sellstown → Dublin

=== Oregon ===
- Halfway → Halfway
- Marysville → Corvallis
- Skinner's Mudhole → Eugene City → Eugene

=== Pennsylvania ===
- Ammansland → Darby
- Augustatown → Washington
- Bridgetown → Midway → Coates’ Villa → Coatesville
- Chamassungh → Finlandia → Marcus Hook
- Cross Keys → Intercourse
- Fort Duquesne → Pittsburgh → Pittsburg* → Pittsburgh
- Mauch Chunk → Jim Thorpe
- Mölndal → Yeadon
- Northampton → Allentown
- Pigeontown → Blue Bell (1840)
- Presque Isle → Erie
- Printztorp → Chester
- Steitztown → Lebanon
- Tequirassy → Eddystone
- Turk's Head → West Chester
- Upland → Chester

*Name recognized by the United States Board on Geographic Names from 1891 to 1911. The name used by the city in its official documents and on its seal was unchanged.

=== Rhode Island ===
- Gloucester → Glocester
- Haversham → Westerly
- Kings Towne → Kingstown → Rochester → North Kingstown
- Shawomet → Warwick

=== South Carolina ===
- Charles Towne → Charleston
- Jeffers → Blaney → Elgin
- Kingston → Conwayborough → Conway
- Tacapua → Startex

=== South Dakota ===
No places in South Dakota have been renamed.

=== Tennessee ===
- Alexandria → Jackson
- Cannonsburgh → Murfreesboro
- Coal Creek → Lake City → Rocky Top
- Fort Nashborough → Nashville
- Taylorsville → Mountain City

=== Texas ===
- Clark → DISH
- Dechman → Deckman → Grand Prairie
- Duncan Switch → Duncanville
- Emerson → Frisco City → Frisco
- Fillmore → Plano (1852)
- Gorbit → Kit → Irving
- Presidio San Antonio de Bexar → San Antonio
- Waterloo → Austin

=== Utah ===
- Evansville → Lehi
- Grayson → Blanding
- Great Salt Lake City → Salt Lake City
- Muskrat Springs → Hooperville → Hooper
- Pleasant Green → Magna

=== Vermont ===
- Alburgh → Alburg → Alburgh
- Brattleborough → Brattleboro
- Isle La Motte → Vineyard → Isle La Motte
- Killington → Sherburne → Killington
- Middle Hero → Grand Isle
- Wildersburgh → Barre

=== Virginia ===
- Kecoughtan → Hampton
- Mt. Pleasant → Mt. Jackson
- Mud Lick→ Big Lick → Roanoke
- Shryock → Edinburg
- Staufferstadt → Strasburg
- Tom's Creek → Toms Brook
- Tysons Corner → Tysons

=== Washington ===
- Neppel → Moses Lake
- North Yakima → Yakima
- Spokane Falls → Spokane
- Tolt → Carnation → Tolt → Carnation
- Vera → Veradale
- Yakima City → Union Gap

=== West Virginia ===
- Beauchamp's Mills → Elizabeth
- California → Spencer
- Chilton → Clendenin
- Clifton → Pratt
- Coal Valley Post Office → Montgomery's Landing → Coal Valley → Cannelton → Montgomery
- Cologne → Leon
- Concord → Athens
- Elizaville → Brownsville → Marmet
- Frenchville → Oakvale
- Hallsville → Davy
- Jeanette → Anawalt
- Lawsonsville → Lawnsville → Aracoma → Logan
- Miner's City → War
- Newport → Parkersburg
- Philippi → Colesmouth → Kanawha City → St. Albans
- Trout’s Hill → Fairview → Wayne
- Upper Creek → Handley
- Waggener's Bottom → Mason

=== Wisconsin ===
- Prairieville → Waukesha
- Rochester → Sheboygan Falls

=== Wyoming ===
No places in Wyoming have been renamed.

== Venezuela ==
- Angostura → Ciudad Bolívar (1846)
- Santiago de León de Caracas → Caracas

== Vietnam ==
- Tourane → Thai Phien → Đà Nẵng
- Djiring → Di Linh
- Tống Bình → Long Đỗ → Đại La → Thăng Long → Đông Đô → Đông Kinh → Bắc Thành → Thăng Long → Hà Nội (Hanoi)
- Hai Pho → Faifo → Hội An
- Prey Nokor → Gia Định → Sài Gòn (Saigon) → Thành Phố Hồ Chí Minh (Ho Chi Minh City)
- Phu Xuan → Huế
- Ke Van → Ke Vinh → Vinh Giang → Vinh Doanh → Vinh Thi → Vinh

== Western Sahara ==
- Villa Cisneros → Dakhla

== See also ==
- List of administrative division name changes
- Neighborhood rebranding in New York City
