= William Harrison Nebergall =

American inorganic chemist (1914–1978)

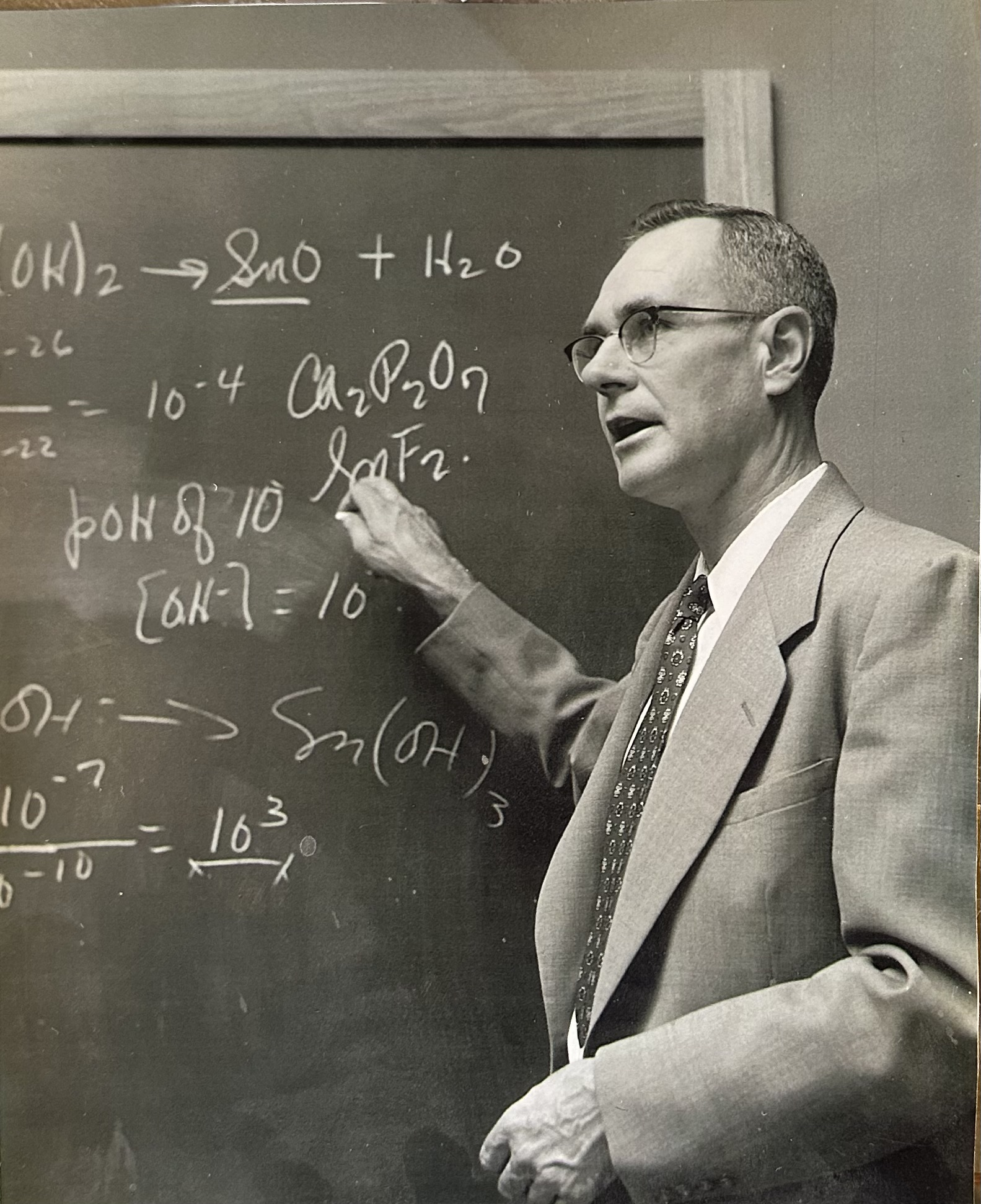
Nebergall describing his calcium pyrophosphate discovery

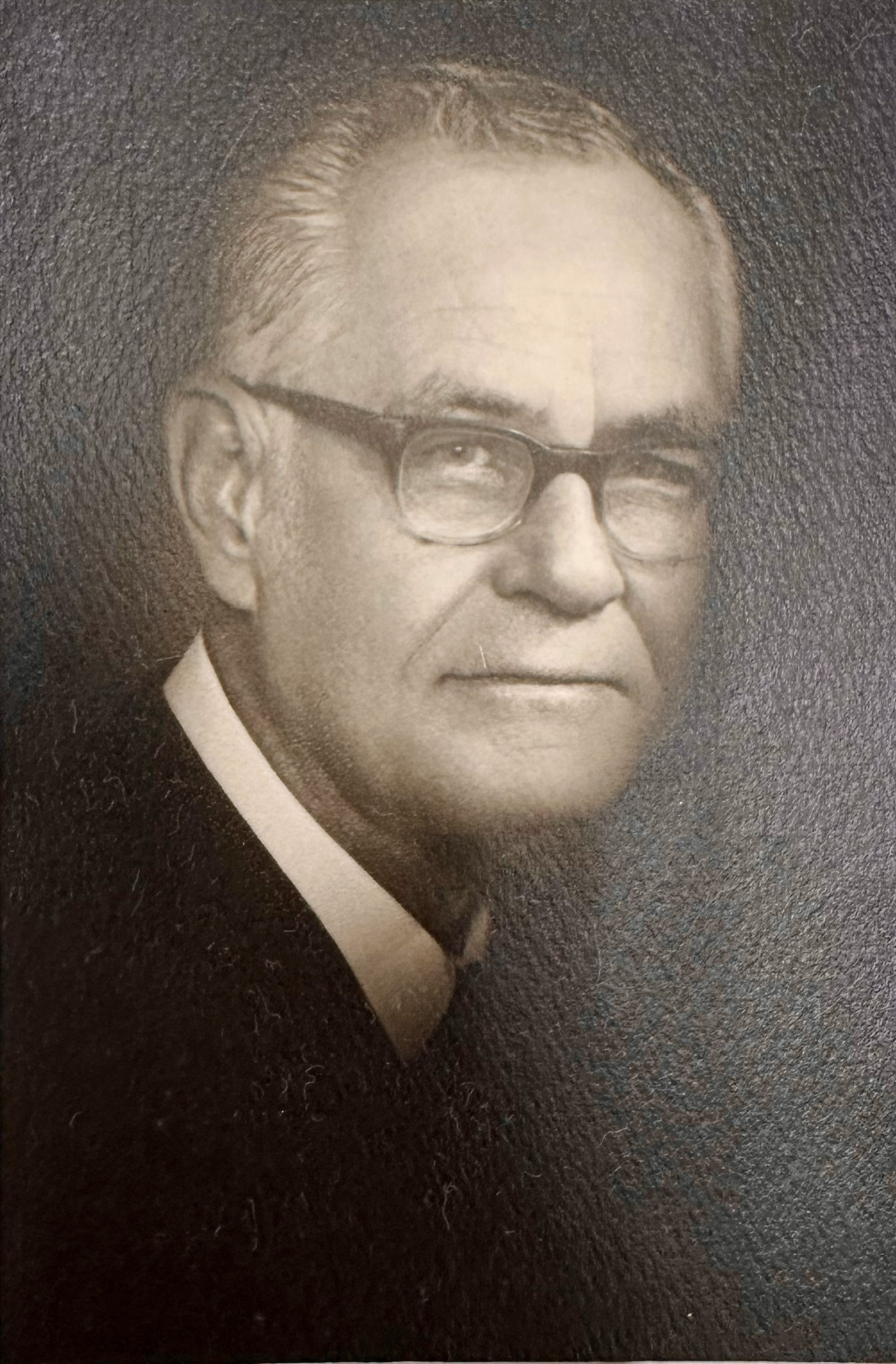

William Harrison Nebergall (21 December 1914 – 2 September 1978) was an inorganic chemist who synthesized the fluoride compatible polishing agent calcium pyrophosphate. This discovery combined with stannous fluoride led to the development and release of the first fluoride containing toothpaste, Crest, in 1955. In 1960 Crest became the first toothpaste to be endorsed by the American Dental Association as an effective decay-preventing agent. In 1959 he cowrote one of the first widely used textbooks of college chemistry titled General Chemistry, which was published in six editions.

== Early life ==
William H. Nebergall was the second of four children of Clarence Cleveland Nebergall and Zelpha Maude Miller Nebergall. He was born in a farm house in Cuba, Illinois, and attended a one-room school house in Cuba. Nebergall felt like phonetis and extensive drilling in spelling and arithmetic were more important in education than extensive curricula and palatial physical facilities. He married Florence Johnson on 18 September 1940 and had three children: William, James, and Susan.

Nebergall received his Bachelor of Education Degree at Western Illinois State Teachers College in 1936 and his Masters of Science in chemistry from University of Illinois in 1939. He spent the next 10 years as a college chemistry instructor, including East Tennessee State Teachers College in Johnson City from 1939 to 1941, at the University of Kentucky from 1941 to 1942, at State Teachers College in Superior, Wisconsin from 1942 to 1944 and then starting in 1944 at the University of Minnesota where he received his Ph.D. in chemistry in 1949.

== Indiana University ==
In 1950, Nebergall was offered and took a position at Indiana University Department of Chemistry as an assistant professor. It was here that he was introduced to Joseph C. Muhler, DDS, who was working on a Ph.D. in chemistry.

While Muhler was in dental school at IU he had begun research in the use of fluoride to reduce dental carries. It had been widely known that natural occurring fluoride in ground water could reduce or eliminate dental caries based on studies performed early in the 1900s by the dentist Frederick McKay. Muhler began using samples of various fluoride salts that were produced by fellow IU chemist Frank C. Mathers and determined that stannous fluoride produced the most robust dental decay prevention.

During the course of the stannous fluoride research it was found that the dicalcium phosphate polishing agent in the dental paste readily absorbed fluoride making it unavailable for use in fighting cavities. Nebergall learned from Mathers that heating limestone(calcium carbinate) rendered the substance less reactive. He used this information to prove that heating the dicalcium phosphate to between 300 and 1100 degrees Celsius resulted in the structure being converted to calcium pyrophosphate. This new substance would not react with the stannous fluoride while keeping the polishing properties of dicalcium phosphate. This finding led to Nebergall's US patent number 2,876,166.

Muhler and Nebergall, along with Chemistry Department Chairman Harry G. Day, began to publish their data to support the idea that stannous fluoride combined with calcium pyrophosphate could be used as a dental paste to help with the reduction of dental caries. These studies, which were financed by Procter & Gamble of Cincinnati, Ohio, led to the development of Crest toothpaste whose initial marketing tag line was "Look, Ma, no cavities".

=== Awards ===
On April 4, 2024, the American Chemical Society presented a National Historic Chemical Landmark to the Indiana University Department of Chemistry for the research of Nebergall, Muhler, and Day that led to the development of Crest Toothpaste nearly 70 years before.
