= Fred Ekstrand =

American football player and coach

Biographical details
- Born: March 9, 1899; Yates City, Illinois, U.S.
- Died: July 8, 1972 (aged 73); Eugene, Oregon, U.S.

Coaching career (HC unless noted)
- 1953–1955: Iowa Wesleyan

Head coaching record
- Overall: 15–10–1
- Bowls: 0–1

Accomplishments and honors

Championships
- 1 Iowa Conference (1953); 1 Iowa Conference Southern Division (1953)

Fred Otis Ekstrand (March 9, 1899 – July 8, 1972) was an American football player and coach. He served as the head football coach at Iowa Wesleyan College in Mount Pleasant, Iowa from 1953 to 1955, where he led the school to an undefeated season in 1953. Ekstrand was born on March 9, 1899, in Yates City, Illinois. He graduated from Yates City High School there in 1919 and from Iowa Wesleyan College in 1925. Ekstrand was struck by a car and killed while he was crossing a street on July 8, 1972, in Eugene, Oregon, where he was attending the U.S. Olympics track and field trials.

== Head coaching record ==
Year	Team	Overall	Conference	Standing	Bowl/playoffs
Iowa Wesleyan Tigers (Iowa Conference) (1953–1955)
1953	Iowa Wesleyan	9–1	4–0	1st (Southern)	L Corn
1954	Iowa Wesleyan	4–4	4–2	4th	
1955	Iowa Wesleyan	2–5–1	2–3–1	5th	
Iowa Wesleyan:		15–10–1	10–5–1		
Total:		15–10–1			
National championship Conference title Conference division title or championship game berth
