= Joseph C. Muhler =

American biochemist and dentist

Joseph Charles Muhler (December 22, 1923 – December 24, 1996) was an American biochemist and dentist who was responsible for the development of Crest toothpaste.

== Early life and education ==
Muhler was born in Fort Wayne, Indiana. He attended Indiana University (IU) from 1942 to 1944 until he was drafted into the Navy in December 1944, serving until December 1945. In the Navy, he was an apprentice seaman (AS) in the V-12 unit at the Indiana University School of Dentistry. In 1948, he received his Doctor of Dental Surgery (D.D.S.) and in 1951, he received his Ph.D. in chemistry. He joined the Indiana University faculty in 1951 as an assistant professor. In 1978, he was named research professor of dental science and director of the dentistry's research institute. While at Indiana University, he assisted in the development of the school's first preventative dentistry program until his retirement in 1984.

== Crest toothpaste ==
Muhler was a biochemist who led a team at Indiana University that came up with the original formula for Crest Toothpaste. He studied over 150 fluoride compounds for the purpose of finding a compound that protected teeth from cavities and decay. With help from Harry G. Day, Grant Van Huysen, and William Harrison Nebergall, he found that stannous fluoride was a very effective compound for protecting teeth. After years of studies, they found stannous fluoride to be 50% more effective than sodium fluoride. Procter & Gamble was impressed with their research and decided to underwrite their formula and sell it as Crest Toothpaste in 1956. Crest Toothpaste became the first toothpaste to earn the American Dental Association (ADA) endorsement. Muhler and his team received royalties from Procter & Gamble which they used to help establish the Oral Health Research Institute at Indiana.

== Accomplishments ==
In 1967, he was the recipient of the Navy Distinguished Public Service Award. In 1976, the American Chemical Society (ACS) recognized stannous fluoride toothpaste as one of the 100 greatest discoveries of the previous 100 years. Muhler died on December 24, 1996, at St. Joseph Medical Center in Fort Wayne, Indiana. In 2019, 23 years after his death, both he and William H. Nebergall were elected into the National Inventors Hall of Fame.
