= Putman =

Putman is a surname. Notable people with the surname include:

- Andrée Putman (1925–2013), French interior and product designer
- Curly Putman (1930–2016), American songwriter
- Joris Putman (born 1984), Dutch actor

== See also ==
- Putman Township, Fulton County, Illinois
