= Douglas, Knox County, Illinois =

- Unincorporated community
- Location within Illinois Location within the United States
- Coordinates: 40°47′10″N 90°05′03″W
- Country: United States
- State: Illinois
- County: Knox
- Township: Salem
- Elevation: 643 ft (196 m)
- Time zone: UTC-6 (Central (CST))
  - Summer (DST): UTC-5 (CDT)
- Area code: 309
- GNIS feature ID: 407360

Douglas is an unincorporated community in Knox County, Illinois, United States. Douglas is 3.5 miles (5.6 km) west of Yates City.

== History ==
Clinton L. Ewing (1879–1953), Illinois state legislator, businessman, and farmer, lived with his wife and family in Douglas.
