= 1830s Chicago real estate bubble =

The Chicago real estate bubble of the 1830s was a real estate bubble, during which time the per acre prices (in 2012 dollars) in the future Chicago Loop increased from $800 in 1830 to $327,000 in 1836, before falling to $38,000 per acre by 1841. The Bank of Illinois began foreclosing on large amounts of real estate in the aftermath of the bust before it declared bankruptcy in 1842.

== Background ==
Until the widespread use of railroads, water access was critical to trade; it typically cost as much to move goods 30 miles over land as to ship them across the Atlantic Ocean. As a result, land near shipping routes and key ports was extremely valuable. The opening of the Erie Canal in 1825 caused economic booms throughout the Great Lakes region by opening eastern and European markets to Midwestern farm products, while also allowing for efficient transportation of finished goods and immigrants to the Great Lakes. Chicago, occupying the southwestern terminus of the area accessible by the Erie Canal and providing the easiest portage to the Mississippi River System, would benefit tremendously. Chicago would later name streets Canal and Clinton (for canal proponent DeWitt Clinton) in honor of the commercial importance of the canal to its economy.

Chicago had been recognized since Louis Joliet in the 17th century as a strategic portage site at the junction of the Mississippi River System and the Great Lakes. In 1835, the State of Illinois committed to eliminate the need for portage and to dig the Illinois and Michigan Canal. With its completion, Chicago would become a major focal point of the United States' transportation network.

At this time, the Illinois state government appears to have intended to further boost real estate through aggressive lending practices. Because the Bank of Illinois was beholden to state policy, and because the state legislature forced the bank to support real estate, Homer Hoyt, land economist and real estate appraiser, believes that the Bank of Illinois may not have been charging appropriate interest rates given the probability of default. While furthering the speculative bubble, these low rates increased the risks at the Bank of Illinois, as well as other Illinois banks that followed the Bank of Illinois' lead.

== Boom and Bust ==
As a result of these factors, prices for land in the Chicago Loop rose from essentially nothing in 1830 ($800 per acre in 2012 dollars) to New York levels by 1836 ($327,000 per acre in 2012 dollars), a 40,775% increase, with even higher prices around Dearborn Avenue and the Chicago River. Furthermore, Illinois in general experienced a huge boom in real estate prices and town foundations. Walters estimates that the foundations of 1/3 of all towns ever created in central Illinois occurred between 1835 and 1837.

In 1837, there was widespread panic due to credit tightening from England. On May 29, 1837, as depositors began to withdraw money en masse, Illinois banks suspended payments. As these banks fell into bankruptcy, Illinois' internal improvements, like the canals that were supposed to be financed by the banks, stopped. This led to considerable uncertainty as to Chicago's future, and combined with a general lack of credit, caused Chicago real estate prices to fall approximately 88% from their peak by 1841.

== Aftermath ==
The Illinois and Michigan Canal was finally completed in 1848, connecting Chicago to the Mississippi River and fulfilling the expectations of the original investors. By 1856, even Chicago Loop property that had been purchased at the height of the bubble still yielded a 3.6% annualized return. Statewide, the results were worse, with 2/3 of all Illinois towns founded during the boom abandoned or never occupied, while town foundations came to an abrupt halt and did not begin again until the 1850s.

== Analysis ==
Edward Glaeser, professor of economics at Harvard, notes that the Chicago property bubble was more a product of unpredictability than irrationality. Given the risk that Chicago might not become the transportation hub of the Midwest, values immediately after the crash appear justifiable. And even at the peak of the bubble, Chicago's prospects looked especially bright: land values in 1836 made sense given the defensible assumption that Chicago prices would rise to a quarter of those in New York City.
