= Bernadotte Township =

Bernadotte Township may refer to the following townships in the United States:

- Bernadotte Township, Fulton County, Illinois
- Bernadotte Township, Nicollet County, Minnesota
