= Midway, Illinois =

Midway, Illinois may refer to the following places in the U.S. state of Illinois:

- Midway, Fulton County, Illinois, a ghost town
- Midway, Madison County, Illinois, an unincorporated community
- Midway, Tazewell County, Illinois, an unincorporated community
- Midway, Vermilion County, Illinois, an unincorporated community
- Midway International Airport, an airport in Chicago, Illinois
- Midway Plaisance, a park on the South Side of Chicago, known locally as the Midway
