= Owen B. West =

American farmer, businessman, and politician

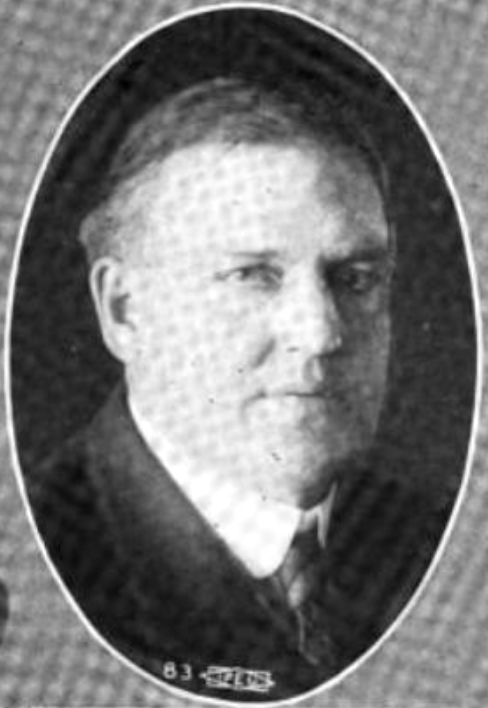

Member of the Illinois House of Representatives
- In office 1914–1928

Personal details
- Born: Owen Betterton West; August 1, 1869 Salem Township, Knox County, Illinois, US
- Died: August 20, 1948 (aged 79) Elmwood, Illinois, US
- Party: Republican
- Education: Lombard College
- Occupation: Farmer, businessman, politician

Owen Betterton West (August 1, 1869 – August 20, 1948) was an American farmer, businessman, and politician.

== Biography ==
West was born on a farm in Salem Township, Knox County, Illinois. He went to the Yates City, Illinois public schools and to Lombard College in Galesburg, Illinois. West also sent to Brown's Business College. He was a farmer and businessman. West lived in Yates City with his wife and family. He served as mayor of Yates City and was a Republican. West served in the Illinois House of Representatives from 1915 to 1927. West died from a heart attack.
