= Tri-County Airport (Illinois) =

- IATA: none; ICAO: none; FAA LID: 2C6

Summary
- Airport type: Public use
- Owner: Tri-County Arpt Devel Corp.
- Serves: Yates City, Illinois
- Elevation AMSL: 661 ft (201 m)
- Coordinates: 40°46′26″N 090°04′28″W

Map
- Location of airport in Illinois 2C6 (the United States)

Runways
Direction	Length		Surface
Direction	ft	m	Surface
2/20	2,809	856	Turf

Statistics (2020)
- Aircraft operations: 10,000
- Based aircraft: 28
- Source: Federal Aviation Administration

Tri-County Airport (FAA LID: 2C6) is a privately owned, public use airport located in Salem Township, Knox County, Illinois, United States, 3 nautical miles (5.6 km) west of the central business district of Yates City.

== Facilities and aircraft ==
Tri-County Airport covers an area of 27 acres (11 ha) at an elevation of 661 feet (201 m) above mean sea level. It has one runway designated 2/20 with a turf surface measuring 2,809 by 150 feet (856 x 46 m).

For the 12-month period ending April 30, 2020, the airport had 10,000 general aviation aircraft operations, an average of 27 per day. At that time there were 28 aircraft based at this airport: 71% single-engine, 25% ultralight, and 4% glider.

== Accidents & Incidents ==
- On May 10, 2014, a Pazmany PL-4 crashed while operating in the traffic pattern at Tri-County Airport. The pilot had completed a 20-minute local flight and returned to the airport to practice landings. After his first touch-and-go, the aircraft experienced a complete loss of thrust while in the traffic pattern. The pilot performed a forced landing. The probable cause was found to be a failure of the reduction drive unit resulting from improper installation of the unit.
- On April 23, 2016, a Cessna 172 Skyhawk landed inverted in a field after takeoff from Tri-County. The aircraft was substantially damaged, but the two occupants only experienced minor injuries.
- On September 19, 2018, a plane crashed while trying to land at Tri-County Airport. Witnesses reported a sputtering sound while the aircraft was on approach. The aircraft touched down short of the runway and flipped over, closing the airport for a time. The two occupants received minor injuries.

== See also ==
- List of airports in Illinois
