= Clinton L. Ewing =

American politician (1879–1953)

Clinton L. Ewing (December 7, 1879 – January 23, 1953) was an American politician and businessman.

Ewing was born in Yates City, Illinois and went to the Yates City public schools. He went to the Brown's Business College in Galesburg, Illinois. Ewing worked in the banking business and was a farmer. Ewing lived with his wife and family in Douglas, Knox County, Illinois. Ewing served on the Knox County Board of Supervisors and was the chairman of the county board. Ewing served in the Illinois House of Representatives from 1927 to 1931 and was a Republican. He then served in the Illinois Senate from 1931 to 1943. He died at his home in Douglas, Illinois.
