= Midway, Tazewell County, Illinois =

Midway, Illinois
- Unincorporated community
- Location within Illinois Location within the United States
- Coordinates: 40°31′10″N 89°39′43″W
- Country: United States
- State: Illinois
- County: Tazewell
- Township: Cincinnati
- Elevation: 515 ft (157 m)
- Time zone: UTC-6 (Central (CST))
  - Summer (DST): UTC-5 (CDT)
- Area code: 309
- GNIS feature ID: 413521

Midway is an unincorporated community in Cincinnati Township, Tazewell County, Illinois, United States. Midway is located on Illinois Route 29, 3.5 miles (5.6 km) south of Pekin.
