= Bybee, Illinois =

- Ghost town
- Location in Fulton County, Illinois
- Coordinates: 40°35′52″N 90°11′5″W
- Country: United States
- State: Illinois
- County: Fulton
- Township: Joshua
- Elevation: 682 ft (208 m)

Bybee is a former settlement in Fulton County, Illinois, United States. The settlement was about 2.7 miles (4.3 km) south-southwest of Fairview and 8.3 miles (13.4 km) west-northwest of Canton.

The community was laid out by David Bybee on a narrow gauge railway: probably the Fulton County Narrow Gauge Railroad that operated from 1880 to the 1920s. That railway was converted into standard gauge c. 1910. In 1905, two trains per day passed through Bybee; by 1913, only one train a day. There was a school, store, and train stop on the narrow gauge rail. There is a small cemetery near where this community formerly existed. The track was removed from this area when the narrow gauge company discontinued service between Galesburg and Fairview.

The name Bybee is in four nearby geographic features in the Geographic Names Information System: the settlement (422523), a station (1802152) 1,550 feet (0.294 mi; 0.47 km) to the east, and two entries (405312 and 1984238) that appear to be the same cemetery 2,500 feet (0.47 mi; 0.76 km) west of the settlement, all along Cypress Road just south of Turkey Creek. There is also another cemetery (1773316) with the name Bybee, 13.8 miles (22.2 km) east-southeast of the settlement in Banner Township.

== See also ==
- List of ghost towns in Illinois

== Bibliography ==
- Callary, Edward (2009) Place Names of Illinois Urbana & Chicago; University of Illinois Press. ISBN 9780252033568
