= List of administrative division name changes =

This is a list of administrative divisions whose names were officially changed at one or more points in history. It does not include gradual changes in spelling.

== Argentina ==
- Eva Perón → La Pampa (1955)
- Presidente Perón → Chaco (1955)

== Australia ==
- Swan River Colony → Western Australia (1832)
- Van Diemen's Land → Tasmania (1856)
- North Australia → Northern Territory (1931)
- Central Australia → Northern Territory (1931)
- Federal Capital Territory → Australian Capital Territory (1938)

== Brazil ==
- Guaporé → Rondônia (1956)
- Rio Branco → Roraima (1962)

== Canada ==
- Acadia → Nova Scotia
- Isle Saint-Jean → Prince Edward Island
- Upper Canada → Canada West → Ontario
- Newfoundland → Newfoundland and Labrador (2001)
- Red River Colony → Manitoba
- Province of Quebec → Lower Canada → Canada East → Quebec

== Czechia ==
- Budějovický kraj → Jihočeský kraj (2001)
- Jihlavský kraj → Vysočina (2001) → Kraj Vysočina (2011)
- Brněnský kraj → Jihomoravský kraj (2001)
- Ostravský kraj → Moravskoslezský kraj (2001)

== France ==
- Centre → Centre-Val de Loire (2015)

== Hong Kong ==
- Castle Peak → Tuen Mun

== India ==
- Madras State → Tamil Nadu (1969)
- Mysore State → Karnataka (1973)
- Orissa → Odisha (2009)

== Indonesia ==
- Daerah Istimewa Aceh → Nanggroe Aceh Darussalam (2002) → Aceh (2009)
- Irian Jaya → Papua (2002)
- Irian Jaya Barat → Papua Barat (2007)

== Ireland ==
- King's County → County Offaly (1922)
- Queen's County → County Laois (1922)
- County Donegal → County Tirconaill (1922) → County Donegal (1927)

== Kazakhstan ==
- South Kazakhstan Region → Turkistan Region (2018)

== Mozambique ==
- Lourenço Marques Province → Maputo Province (1976)
- Moçambique Province → Nampula Province (1975)

== Pakistan ==
- North-West Frontier Province → Khyber Pakhtunkhwa (2010)

== Philippines ==
- Compostela Valley → Davao de Oro (2019)
- North Cotabato → Cotabato (1984)

== Serbia ==
- Autonomous Province of Vojvodina (1944–1968) → Socialist Autonomous Province of Vojvodina (1968–1990)
- Autonomous Region of Kosovo and Metohija (1945–1963) → Autonomous Province of Kosovo and Metohija (1963–1968) → Socialist Autonomous Province of Kosovo (1968–1990) → Autonomous Province of Kosovo and Metohija (1990–present)

== South Africa ==
- Natal → KwaZulu/Natal (27 April 1994) → KwaZulu-Natal (4 February 1997)
- Pretoria-Witwatersrand-Vereeniging → Gauteng (3 July 1995)
- Orange Free State → Free State (3 July 1995)
- Eastern Transvaal → Mpumalanga (20 September 1995)
- Northern Transvaal → Northern Province (20 September 1995) → Limpopo (11 July 2003)
- North-West → North West (4 February 1997)

== South Korea ==
- Sabi → Soburi → Buyeo
- Tamra → Cheju → Jeju

== Sweden ==
- Kopparberg County → Dalarna County (1997)

== Thailand ==
- Khukhan province → Sisaket province (1938)
- Krung Kao province → Phra Nakhon Si Ayutthaya province (1919)
- Sawankhalok province → Sukhothai province (1939)

== United States ==
- Rhode Island and Providence Plantations → Rhode Island (30 November 2020)

== See also ==
- List of city name changes
