= Centerville, Illinois =

Centerville, Illinois could refer to:

- "Centerville, Illinois", the fictional setting of the 1983 science fiction spoof Strange Invaders
- Centerville, Calhoun County, Illinois, an unincorporated community in Calhoun County
- Centerville, Grundy County, Illinois, a former community in Grundy County
- Centerville, Knox County, Illinois, an unincorporated community in Knox County
- Centerville, Macoupin County, Illinois, an unincorporated community in Macoupin County
- Centerville, Morgan County, Illinois, an unincorporated community in Morgan County
- Centerville, Piatt County, Illinois, an unincorporated community in Piatt County
- Centerville, White County, Illinois, an unincorporated community in White County
- Cuba, Illinois, formerly known as Centerville
- Woodstock, Illinois, formerly known as Centerville

== See also ==
- Centreville, Illinois, St. Clair County
