= Paul H. Landis =

American sociologist (1901–1985)

- Born: 5 March 1901; Cuba, Illinois
- Died: 30 August 1985 (aged 84); Glendale, California, United States
- Education: University of Michigan; University of Minnesota
- Known for: work on Rural Sociology, Sociology of Education and Social Control
- Spouse: Bess Banks
- Scientific career
- Fields: Rural sociology, Natural resource sociology
- Workplaces: South Dakota State University; Washington State University

Paul Henry Landis (5 March 1901 – 30 August 1985) was an American sociologist. A prolific writer of over 20 books and 100 journal articles, Landis's work spanned the fields of rural sociology, Natural Resource Sociology, Sociology of Education, Adolescence, Social Control, and many other topics. Born in Cuba, Illinois, Landis was raised in a fundamentalist religious upbringing, before attending Greenville College and eventually the University of Michigan for a master's degree and The University of Minnesota for a PhD. After graduation from the University of Minnesota in 1931, Landis joined the faculty of South Dakota State University (then called South Dakota State College) as an assistant professor in the Department of Rural Sociology. His PhD dissertation on Minnesota's Iron Range was published as the book Three Iron Mining Towns: a study in cultural change, now considered a landmark in Natural Resource Sociology. In 1935 he joined the faculty of the Washington State University (at the time called the State College of Washington), eventually becoming the official State Professor of Sociology, as well eventually Dean of the Graduate School at Washington State. Landis was elected and served as president of the Rural Sociological Society from 1945–1946.
