= Loren E. Murphy =

American judge (1882–1963)

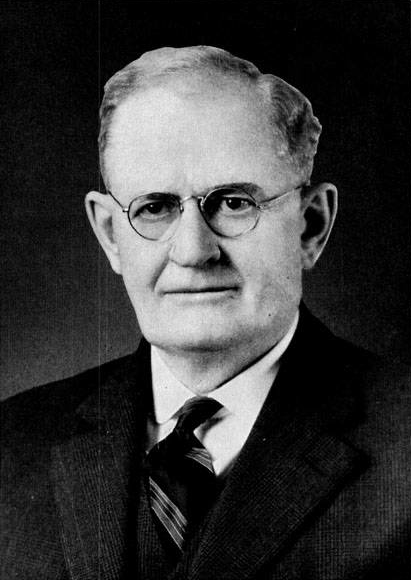
- Murphy's official photograph, c. 1947

Personal details
- Born: July 25, 1882 Fulton County, Illinois, U.S.
- Died: June 2, 1963 (aged 80) Monmouth, Illinois, U.S.
- Education: University of Michigan
- Occupation: Lawyer, judge

Loren E. Murphy (July 25, 1882 – June 2, 1963) was an American jurist who served as an associate justice and chief justice of the Illinois Supreme Court.

Born on a farm near Cuba, in Fulton County, Illinois, Murphy received his law degree from University of Michigan Law School in 1906 and then practiced law in Monmouth, Illinois. Murphy served as president of the Monmouth Board of Education and as mayor of Monmouth. He served as county judge for Warren County, Illinois and then as Illinois Circuit Court judge. Murphy also served on the Illinois Appellate Court. From 1939 to 1948, Murphy served on the Illinois Supreme Court and was chief justice. Murphy died at his home in Monmouth, Illinois.
