= Joshua Township, Fulton County, Illinois =

Joshua Township
- Township
- Location in Fulton County

- Fulton County's location in Illinois
- Coordinates: 40°34′50″N 90°09′28″W
- Country: United States
- State: Illinois
- County: Fulton
- Established: November 6, 1849

Area
  - Total: 35.53 sq mi (92.0 km^{2})
  - Land: 34.83 sq mi (90.2 km^{2})
  - Water: 0.70 sq mi (1.8 km^{2}) 1.96%
- Elevation: 646 ft (197 m)

Population (2020)
  - Total: 465
  - Density: 13.4/sq mi (5.15/km^{2})
- Time zone: UTC-6 (CST)
  - Summer (DST): UTC-5 (CDT)
- ZIP codes: 61427, 61432, 61520
- FIPS code: 17-057-38713

Joshua Township is one of twenty-six townships in Fulton County, Illinois, USA. As of the 2020 census, its population was 465 and it contained 192 housing units.

== Geography ==
According to the 2021 census gazetteer files, Joshua Township has a total area of 35.53 square miles (92.02 km^{2}), of which 34.83 square miles (90.21 km^{2}) (or 98.04%) is land and 0.70 square miles (1.81 km^{2}) (or 1.96%) is water.

=== Unincorporated towns ===
(This list is based on USGS data and may include former settlements.)

- Fiatt
- Bybee
- Sugarville

=== Cemeteries ===
The township contains these cemeteries: Bybee, Fiatt, Gardiner, Locust Lane and Moore.

=== Major highways ===
- Illinois Route 9
- Illinois Route 97

== Demographics ==
As of the 2020 census there were 465 people, 219 households, and 176 families residing in the township. The population density was 13.09 inhabitants per square mile (5.05/km^{2}). There were 192 housing units at an average density of 5.40 per square mile (2.08/km^{2}). The racial makeup of the township was 94.62% White, 0.00% African American, 0.00% Native American, 0.00% Asian, 0.00% Pacific Islander, 0.00% from other races, and 5.38% from two or more races. Hispanic or Latino of any race were 0.22% of the population.

There were 219 households, out of which 27.40% had children under the age of 18 living with them, 56.62% were married couples living together, 12.33% had a female householder with no spouse present, and 19.63% were non-families. 19.60% of all households were made up of individuals, and 9.10% had someone living alone who was 65 years of age or older. The average household size was 3.26 and the average family size was 3.47.

The township's age distribution consisted of 25.4% under the age of 18, 11.4% from 18 to 24, 14.9% from 25 to 44, 29.4% from 45 to 64, and 19.1% who were 65 years of age or older. The median age was 36.0 years. For every 100 females, there were 100.3 males. For every 100 females age 18 and over, there were 106.2 males.

The median income for a household in the township was $78,092, and the median income for a family was $81,250. Males had a median income of $23,571 versus $28,381 for females. The per capita income for the township was $28,494. About 15.3% of families and 24.1% of the population were below the poverty line, including 80.1% of those under age 18 and none of those age 65 or over.

Historical population
Census	Pop.	Note	%±
2000	615		—
2010	510		−17.1%
2020	465		−8.8%
U.S. Decennial Census

== School districts ==
- Canton Union School District 66
- Community Unit School District 3 Fulton County
- Spoon River Valley Community Unit School District 4

== Political districts ==
- Illinois' 17th congressional district
- State House District 91
- State Senate District 46
