= South Pekin, Illinois =

South Pekin
- Village
- Location of South Pekin in Tazewell County, Illinois.
- Coordinates: 40°29′54″N 89°39′07″W
- Country: United States
- State: Illinois
- County: Tazewell
- Township: Cincinnati Township
- Founded: April 12, 1917

Area
  - Village: 0.51 sq mi (1.33 km^{2})
  - Land: 0.51 sq mi (1.33 km^{2})
  - Water: 0 sq mi (0.00 km^{2})
- Elevation: 512 ft (156 m)

Population (2020)
  - Village: 996
  - Density: 1,935.8/sq mi (747.41/km^{2})
  - Metro: 380,447
- Time zone: UTC-6 (CST)
  - Summer (DST): UTC-5 (CDT)
- ZIP code: 61564
- Area code: 309
- FIPS code: 17-71175
- GNIS feature ID: 2399852
- Website: villageofsouthpekin.org

South Pekin is a village in Tazewell County, Illinois, United States. The population was 996 at the 2020 census and is part of the Peoria, Illinois Metropolitan Statistical Area.

== History ==
South Pekin was incorporated on April 12, 1917, five miles south of Pekin in an area previously known as "McFadden Flats". The village is located in Sections 27 and 34 of Cincinnati Township, which was formed in 1850. South Pekin began as a railway station on the Chicago and Northwestern Railroad (C&NW).

Settlement began in the 1820s in the South Pekin area when white settlers arrived in the future Tazewell County. The railroad constructed its line from Nelson, Illinois to Peoria in 1901. In 1904, C&NW discovered a large coalfield near Staunton in Macoupin County. A few years later, C&NW decided to build a line of access to the coal field and carry freight between Chicago and St. Louis. By March 1912, the right of way had been purchased and construction was started. C&NW needed a water, refueling, and repair station midway on the new line. The first choice for the location of this new station was Green Valley, Illinois, but residents protested and the railroad selected South Pekin as the site of the new station.

Al Casper was the first permanent resident; he arrived with his family on December 25, 1912. More families arrived and the railroad gave them boxcars to use as homes on a location that was known as McFadden Flats. The village of South Pekin was laid out in Cincinnati Township on July 10, 1913 and incorporated on April 12, 1917.

The economic possibilities that came with the railroad caused business leaders in Pekin to be very interested to pull the switch yard closer and get the new "railroad people" with steady work and good pay in their town. Ultimately most employees opted to settle close to the yard which was already located in South Pekin. In addition to the numerous blue collar jobs the C&NW operation also brought management positions and erected a three-story masonry office building (which was demolished near the beginning of the 21st century). South Pekin was a home terminal for Chicago and Northwestern Railroad crews in the twentieth century. Trains were made up in the middle of the town in a "Kick" Yard. After the trains were put together, crews would get on the train and proceed south to East St. Louis or north to Nelson, where they would be relieved and allowed to sleep for the next tour of operation. The Chicago and Northwestern also maintained a bunkhouse in South Pekin where crews could stop for the night. In the 1970s train crews would go onward through Nelson and proceed to Proviso (a suburb of Chicago) or to Clinton, Iowa. At times there were as many as 20 trains per day either made up at South Pekin or that went through South Pekin.

South Pekin has been a home to a recording studio called The Golden Voice Recording, owned and operated by Jerry L and Mary Anne Milam. The studio was in operation from 1966 to 1978. A fire that was believed to be arson destroyed the recording studio in 1978.

=== Disasters ===
South Pekin has seen its share of disasters, starting with flooding during the Great Mississippi Flood of 1927. The town's worst disaster was the F3 tornado of March 30, 1938, that destroyed much of South Pekin and killed nine of the village's residents; it remains the deadliest tornado in Central Illinois over 85 years later. National Weather Service research suggests the storm was a super-cell that spawned up to five tornadoes. On May 9, 1995 another tornado rated F1 moved northeast across town, destroying several garages and destroying a railroad barracks. Two injuries and around one million dollars in damage was reported. On May 15, a tornado touched down just south of town that would later hit Tremont. On May 10, 2003, South Pekin was again hit by a tornado. The tornado touched down three miles southwest of town around 9:45 P.M. and crossed Highway 29 into the village at F3 intensity. It went through the village at 9:50 PM and was about a quarter mile wide. There were 23 injuries in South Pekin but no fatalities. The town was rebuilt over the next ten years and constructed a new tornado warning system.

== Geography ==
According to the 2010 census, South Pekin has a total area of 0.5 square miles (1.29 km^{2}), all land.

== Demographics ==
Historical population
Census	Pop.	Note	%±
1920	944		—
1930	1,222		29.4%
1940	1,044		−14.6%
1950	1,043		−0.1%
1960	1,007		−3.5%
1970	955		−5.2%
1980	1,243		30.2%
1990	1,184		−4.7%
2000	1,162		−1.9%
2010	1,146		−1.4%
2020	996		−13.1%
U.S. Decennial Census

As of 2010, there were 1,146 people, 437 households, and 314 families residing in the village. The population density was 2,292 people per square mile (884 people/km^{2}). There were 437 housing units at an average density of 874 per square mile (337.5 housing units/km^{2}). The racial makeup of the village was 98.17% White, 0.35% Black, 0.17% Native American, 0.09% Asian, and 0.96% from two or more races. Hispanic or Latino origin made up 1.31%.

In the village, the population was spread out, with 31.0% under the age of 18, 9.1% from 18 to 24, 32.3% from 25 to 44, 18.1% from 45 to 64, and 9.6% who were 65 years of age or older. The median age was 31 years. For every 100 females, there were 97.6 males. For every 100 females age 18 and over, there were 95.1 males.

The median income for a household in the village was $40,455, and the median income for a family was $42,102. Males had a median income of $32,292 versus $20,125 for females. The per capita income for the village was $15,717. About 6.1% of families and 7.1% of the population were below the poverty line, including 6.0% of those under age 18 and none of those age 65 or over. The unemployment rate in South Pekin was 6.2% as of March 2015. While higher than the national unemployment rate, this is lower than the state average and significantly lower than other communities in the metro area.

== Education ==
The school districts are South Pekin School District 137 (elementary) and Pekin Community High School District 303.

== See also ==
- May 2003 tornado outbreak sequence
