= Skeeter Bonn =

American singer-songwriter

Junior Lewis Boughan
- Also known as: Skeeter Bonn
- Born: April 6, 1923; Sugarville, Fulton County, Illinois
- Origin: USA
- Died: November 6, 1994 (aged 71)
- Genre: Country music
- Instruments: Guitar; yodeling
- Years active: 1950s
- Label: RCA Victor
- Formerly of: Shirley Starr

Skeeter Bonn (Junior Lewis Boughan, 6 April 1923 – 6 November 1994) was a singer and guitar player on several national country music radio programs and had several singles on RCA Victor in the 1950s.

He was born in 1923 in Sugarville, a small settlement in Fulton County, Illinois. At age 13 he left the family farm for nearby Canton. He joined the United States Navy in 1942, married Mary Louise Strode of Canton in 1945, and received an honorable discharge from the Navy in 1946.

He won a singing championship in Illinois in 1949, and by 1951 he was on the Iowa Barn Dance Frolic on WHO (AM) in Des Moines, Iowa. After that he was a regular on the WLS National Barn Dance from Chicago, WLW Midwestern Hayride from Cincinnati, and WWVA Jamboree from Wheeling, West Virginia.

In addition to his ten or so singles on RCA Victor, he also had a single on Sims Records, No. 325 "Let Me Be The One", backed with "Off To Vietnam (In The Green)".
