= Uniontown, Illinois =

- Unincorporated community
- Location within Illinois Location within the United States
- Coordinates: 40°44′51″N 90°05′55″W
- Country: United States
- State: Illinois
- County: Knox
- Township: Salem
- Elevation: 682 ft (208 m)
- Time zone: UTC-6 (Central (CST))
  - Summer (DST): UTC-5 (CDT)
- Area code: 309
- GNIS feature ID: 423267

Uniontown is an unincorporated community located in Knox County, Illinois.
