= Mills Prairie, Illinois =

- Former settlement
- Location within Illinois
- Coordinates: 38°30′15″N 87°58′15″W
- Country: United States
- State: Illinois
- County: Edwards
- Elevation: 427 ft (130 m)
- GNIS feature ID: 1808162

Mills Prairie is a former settlement in Edwards County, Illinois, United States. Mills Prairie was 2 miles (3.2 km) southeast of West Salem.
