= Civer, Illinois =

- Ghost town
- Location within Illinois
- Coordinates: 40°31′27″N 090°06′27″W
- Country: United States
- State: Illinois
- County: Fulton
- Township: Putman
- Elevation: 679 ft (207 m)
- GNIS feature ID: 1719442

Civer is a ghost town in Fulton County, Illinois, United States. Its elevation was 679 feet (207 m). The community no longer exists.
