= Salem Township, Knox County, Illinois =

Salem Township
- Township
- Location in Knox County

- Knox County's location in Illinois
- Coordinates: 40°45′14″N 90°02′34″W
- Country: United States
- State: Illinois
- County: Knox
- Established: November 2, 1852

Area
  - Total: 36.38 sq mi (94.2 km^{2})
  - Land: 35.78 sq mi (92.7 km^{2})
  - Water: 0.60 sq mi (1.6 km^{2}) 1.66%
- Elevation: 679 ft (207 m)

Population (2020)
  - Total: 926
  - Density: 25.9/sq mi (9.99/km^{2})
- Time zone: UTC-6 (CST)
  - Summer (DST): UTC-5 (CDT)
- ZIP codes: 61458, 61529, 61531, 61572
- FIPS code: 17-095-67223

Salem Township is one of twenty-one townships in Knox County, Illinois, USA. As of the 2020 census, its population was 926 and it contained 469 housing units.

== Geography ==
According to the 2021 census gazetteer files, Salem Township has a total area of 36.38 square miles (94.22 km^{2}), of which 35.78 square miles (92.67 km^{2}) (or 98.34%) is land and 0.60 square miles (1.55 km^{2}) (or 1.66%) is water.

=== Cities, towns, villages ===
- Yates City

=== Unincorporated towns ===
- Douglas at 40.786149°N 90.084284°W
- Uniontown at 40.747538°N 90.098729°W

(This list is based on USGS data and may include former settlements.)

=== Cemeteries ===
The township contains these four cemeteries: Blakeslee, Summitt-Douglas, Uniontown and Yates City.

=== Airports and landing strips ===
- Tri-County Airport

=== Lakes ===
- Grandt Lake

== Demographics ==
As of the 2020 census there were 926 people, 490 households, and 312 families residing in the township. The population density was 25.45 inhabitants per square mile (9.83/km^{2}). There were 469 housing units at an average density of 12.89 per square mile (4.98/km^{2}). The racial makeup of the township was 94.92% White, 0.11% African American, 0.11% Native American, 0.22% Asian, 0.00% Pacific Islander, 0.43% from other races, and 4.21% from two or more races. Hispanic or Latino of any race were 0.97% of the population.

There were 490 households, out of which 24.90% had children under the age of 18 living with them, 50.00% were married couples living together, 10.41% had a female householder with no spouse present, and 36.33% were non-families. 32.00% of all households were made up of individuals, and 16.10% had someone living alone who was 65 years of age or older. The average household size was 2.42 and the average family size was 2.99.

The township's age distribution consisted of 17.6% under the age of 18, 10.8% from 18 to 24, 25.1% from 25 to 44, 23.8% from 45 to 64, and 22.8% who were 65 years of age or older. The median age was 42.7 years. For every 100 females, there were 110.3 males. For every 100 females age 18 and over, there were 99.4 males.

The median income for a household in the township was $54,479, and the median income for a family was $76,250. Males had a median income of $36,000 versus $30,590 for females. The per capita income for the township was $30,664. About 4.2% of families and 10.1% of the population were below the poverty line, including 11.0% of those under age 18 and 11.1% of those age 65 or over.

Historical population
Census	Pop.	Note	%±
2010	1,003		—
2020	926		−7.7%
U.S. Decennial Census

== School districts ==
All of the township is in the Farmington Central Community Unit School District 265.

== Transportation ==
- Tri-County Airport

== Political districts ==
- Illinois's 18th congressional district
- State House District 74
- State Senate District 37
