= Piankashawtown, Illinois =

- Former settlement
- Location within Illinois Location within the United States
- Coordinates: 38°25′52″N 88°05′45″W
- Country: United States
- State: Illinois
- County: Edwards
- Elevation: 417 ft (127 m)
- GNIS feature ID: 1808165

Piankashawtown is a former settlement in Edwards County, Illinois, United States. Piankashawtown was 4 miles (6.4 km) northwest of Albion.
