= Lodi, Illinois =

Lodi, Illinois, may refer to the following communities in Illinois, all of which were once known as Lodi:

- Clark Center, Illinois, in Clark County
- Maple Park, Illinois, in Kane County
- Oswego, Illinois, in Kendall County
