= Cincinnati Township, Tazewell County, Illinois =

Coordinates: 40°31′04″N 89°39′46″W

Cincinnati Township
- Township
- Location in Tazewell County
- Country: United States
- State: Illinois
- County: Tazewell
- Established: November 6, 1849

Area
  - Total: 30.39 sq mi (78.7 km^{2})
  - Land: 30.04 sq mi (77.8 km^{2})
  - Water: 0.36 sq mi (0.93 km^{2}) 1.18%

Population (2010)
  - Estimate (2016): 9,220
  - Density: 316.5/sq mi (122.2/km^{2})
- Time zone: UTC-6 (CST)
  - Summer (DST): UTC-5 (CDT)
- FIPS code: 17-179-14403

Cincinnati Township is located in Tazewell County, Illinois. As of the 2010 census, its population was 9,506 and it contained 3,436 housing units. The township is based in the Village of South Pekin, Illinois.

== History ==
Jonathan Tharp, who settled Pekin, and his family laid out a town to be called Cincinnati. This planned town was between the Illinois River and Broadway, McLean, and Main streets. Although this site was absorbed by Pekin as its population grew, Cincinnati Township is named after this town site.

== Geography ==
According to the 2010 census, the township has a total area of 30.39 square miles (78.7 km^{2}), of which 30.04 square miles (77.8 km^{2}) (or 98.85%) is land and 0.36 square miles (0.93 km^{2}) (or 1.18%) is water.

== Demographics ==
Historical population
Census	Pop.	Note	%±
2016 (est.)	9,220
U.S. Decennial Census

As of 2016, approximately 9220 people live in the area.

== Communities ==
=== Cities ===
- Pekin

=== Villages ===
- South Pekin

=== Unincorporated communities ===
- Garmen
- Glenmar Addition
- Midway

== Transportation ==
=== Major highways ===
- Illinois Route 29

=== Airports ===
- Pekin Municipal Airport (C15) - serves Pekin (Located by the Village of South Pekin, Illinois)
