= Sugarville, Illinois =

Former town in Illinois, USA

Coordinates: 40°33′38″N 90°07′22″W

Sugarville was a community near Put Creek in Joshua Township, Fulton County, Illinois. It once had several houses, a blacksmith shop, and a general store. It no longer exists today.

The Geographic Names Information System lists it only as part of an alias for Moore Cemetery in Joshua Township.

Skeeter Bonn (Junior Lewis Boughan) was born in Sugarville; he moved to Canton when he was 13. In the 1950s, he was a country music performer on several national radio shows, including the WLS National Barn Dance.
