= Lexington, Edwards County, Illinois =

Lexington, Illinois
- Former settlement
- Location within Illinois
- Coordinates: 38°24′57″N 87°57′51″W
- Country: United States
- State: Illinois
- County: Edwards
- Elevation: 394 ft (120 m)
- GNIS feature ID: 1808156

Lexington is a former settlement in Edwards County, Illinois, United States. Lexington was 2.5 miles (4.0 km) southeast of Bone Gap.
