= Putman Township, Fulton County, Illinois =

Putman Township
- Township
- Location in Fulton County

- Fulton County's location in Illinois
- Coordinates: 40°29′36″N 90°09′36″W
- Country: United States
- State: Illinois
- County: Fulton

Area
  - Total: 35.24 sq mi (91.3 km^{2})
  - Land: 33.60 sq mi (87.0 km^{2})
  - Water: 1.63 sq mi (4.2 km^{2}) 4.63%
- Elevation: 607 ft (185 m)

Population (2020)
  - Total: 1,967
  - Density: 58.54/sq mi (22.60/km^{2})
- Time zone: UTC-6 (CST)
  - Summer (DST): UTC-5 (CDT)
- ZIP codes: 61427, 61519, 61520, 61542
- FIPS code: 17-057-62276

Putman Township is one of twenty-six townships in Fulton County, Illinois, USA. As of the 2020 census, its population was 1,967 and it contained 935 housing units.

== Geography ==
According to the 2021 census gazetteer files, Putman Township has a total area of 35.24 square miles (91.27 km^{2}), of which 33.60 square miles (87.02 km^{2}) (or 95.37%) is land and 1.63 square miles (4.22 km^{2}) (or 4.63%) is water.

=== Cities, towns, villages ===
- Cuba

=== Extinct towns ===
- Civer
- Fulton Center

(These are described as "historical" by the USGS.)

=== Cemeteries ===
The township contains these five cemeteries: Blackaby, Connor, Cuba, Saunders and Thompson.

=== Major highways ===
- Illinois Route 95
- Illinois Route 97
- Illinois Route 100

=== Lakes ===
- Fisher Lake
- Frog Lake
- Long Lake
- Lake Marie
- Lake Wee-Ma-Tuk
- Mason Lake
- Rose Lake
- Stevens Lake
- Swimming Lake
- Traer Lake
- Truax Lake
- Woods Lake

== Demographics ==
As of the 2020 census there were 1,967 people, 784 households, and 512 families residing in the township. The population density was 55.83 inhabitants per square mile (21.56/km^{2}). There were 935 housing units at an average density of 26.54 per square mile (10.25/km^{2}). The racial makeup of the township was 96.14% White, 0.36% African American, 0.10% Native American, 0.05% Asian, 0.00% Pacific Islander, 0.10% from other races, and 3.25% from two or more races. Hispanic or Latino of any race were 0.66% of the population.

There were 784 households, out of which 25.60% had children under the age of 18 living with them, 47.70% were married couples living together, 9.31% had a female householder with no spouse present, and 34.69% were non-families. 28.40% of all households were made up of individuals, and 10.50% had someone living alone who was 65 years of age or older. The average household size was 2.28 and the average family size was 2.65.

The township's age distribution consisted of 16.5% under the age of 18, 11.8% from 18 to 24, 15.2% from 25 to 44, 31.5% from 45 to 64, and 25.0% who were 65 years of age or older. The median age was 48.5 years. For every 100 females, there were 107.3 males. For every 100 females age 18 and over, there were 106.3 males.

The median income for a household in the township was $62,500, and the median income for a family was $85,000. Males had a median income of $42,292 versus $32,313 for females. The per capita income for the township was $38,508. About 5.3% of families and 13.3% of the population were below the poverty line, including 23.4% of those under age 18 and 2.4% of those age 65 or over.

Historical population
Census	Pop.	Note	%±
2000	2,141		—
2010	2,137		−0.2%
2020	1,967		−8.0%
U.S. Decennial Census

== School districts ==
- Community Unit School District 3 Fulton City
- Lewistown School District 97

== Political districts ==
- Illinois's 17th congressional district
- State House District 91
- State Senate District 46
