= Bernadotte Township, Fulton County, Illinois =

Bernadotte Township
- Township
- Location in Fulton County

- Fulton County's location in Illinois
- Coordinates: 40°24′24″N 90°16′14″W
- Country: United States
- State: Illinois
- County: Fulton
- Established: November 6, 1849

Area
  - Total: 37.71 sq mi (97.7 km^{2})
  - Land: 37.69 sq mi (97.6 km^{2})
  - Water: 0.02 sq mi (0.052 km^{2}) 0.04%
- Elevation: 476 ft (145 m)

Population (2020)
  - Total: 249
  - Density: 6.61/sq mi (2.55/km^{2})
- Time zone: UTC-6 (CST)
  - Summer (DST): UTC-5 (CDT)
- ZIP codes: 61427, 61441, 61477, 61482, 61542
- FIPS code: 17-057-05469

Bernadotte Township is one of twenty-six townships in Fulton County, Illinois, United States. As of the 2020 census, its population was 249 and it contained 134 housing units.

== Geography ==
According to the 2021 census gazetteer files, Bernadotte Township has a total area of 37.71 square miles (97.67 km^{2}), of which 37.69 square miles (97.62 km^{2}) (or 99.96%) is land and 0.02 square miles (0.05 km^{2}) (or 0.04%) is water.

Tuscumbia is a former town, no longer in existence.

== Demographics ==
As of the 2020 census there were 249 people, 89 households, and 34 families residing in the township. The population density was 6.60 inhabitants per square mile (2.55/km^{2}). There were 134 housing units at an average density of 3.55 per square mile (1.37/km^{2}). The racial makeup of the township was 93.98% White, 0.00% African American, 0.00% Native American, 0.40% Asian, 0.00% Pacific Islander, 3.61% from other races, and 2.01% from two or more races. Hispanic or Latino of any race were 3.61% of the population.

There were 89 households, out of which 28.10% had children under the age of 18 living with them, 12.36% were married couples living together, 25.84% had a female householder with no spouse present, and 61.80% were non-families. 61.80% of all households were made up of individuals, and 50.60% had someone living alone who was 65 years of age or older. The average household size was 2.66 and the average family size was 3.88.

The township's age distribution consisted of 20.7% under the age of 18, 0.0% from 18 to 24, 36.7% from 25 to 44, 19.8% from 45 to 64, and 22.8% who were 65 years of age or older. The median age was 44.5 years. For every 100 females, there were 57.0 males. For every 100 females age 18 and over, there were 63.5 males.

The median income for a household in the township was $40,234, and the median income for a family was $50,000. The per capita income for the township was $16,424. No families and 24.5% of the population were below the poverty line, including none of those under age 18 and 14.8% of those age 65 or over.

Historical population
Census	Pop.	Note	%±
2000	320		—
2010	273		−14.7%
2020	249		−8.8%
U.S. Decennial Census

== Political districts ==
- Illinois's 17th congressional district
- State House District 94
- State Senate District 47
