= Tuscumbia, Illinois =

Human settlement in Illinois, United States of America

Coordinates: 40°24′49.05″N 90°18′8.84″W

Tuscumbia is a ghost town in Bernadotte Township, Fulton County, Illinois, US, that sprang up in the township and was platted by Wade Hampton on 2 March 1837. It consisted of 54 lots. It flourished for a while and had a school, but by 1855, it was abandoned.

A sign on County Road 14, known as the Bernadotte blacktop, nine miles west of Lewistown, Illinois, is the only remnant.

== History ==
Illinois was experiencing rapid settlement during the early 1800s. The timeframe of Tuscumbia coincides with Abraham Lincoln's career. In 1838, Lincoln visited the county seat Lewistown nine miles east of the Tuscumbia area, extending the range of his law practice.

== See also ==
- Ghost Towns
