= Shasta, Illinois =

- Former settlement
- Location within Illinois
- Coordinates: 37°07′54″N 89°23′42″W
- Country: United States
- State: Illinois
- County: Alexander
- Elevation: 331 ft (101 m)
- GNIS feature ID: 1736157

Shasta is a former settlement in Alexander County, Illinois, United States. Shasta was located along the Mississippi River northwest of Tankville.
