= New Salem, Illinois =

New Salem is the name of several places in Illinois:

- New Salem, now also known as Lincoln's New Salem, a recreated former village in Menard County
- New Salem Township, McDonough County, Illinois
- New Salem, Pike County, Illinois
- New Salem Township, Pike County, Illinois

== See also ==
- New Salem (disambiguation)
