= Caledonia, Putnam County, Illinois =

Unincorporated community in Putnam County, Illinois, U.S.

Caledonia Ox-Bow
- Unincorporated community
- Caledonia (Ox-Bow)
- Location in Illinois Location in the United States
- Coordinates: 41°07′07″N 89°15′01″W
- Country: United States
- State: Illinois
- County: Putnam
- Township: Magnolia
- Time zone: UTC-6 (CST)
  - Summer (DST): UTC-5 (CDT)
- ZIP code: 61336

Caledonia is an unincorporated community in Putnam County, Illinois, United States, and is located 3.1 miles west of Magnolia. The Village of Caledonia was established in 1828.

== History ==
There was a schoolhouse erected in 1832. Three houses existed in 1836. The Methodist church was erected in 1854 and a Baptist church was erected in 1857. The post-office was named Ox-Bow because a post office named Caledonia already existed in Pulaski County. To the north is the Caledonia Cemetery, which is all that remains of the original town. The town faded away after losing its post office in the 19th century, and lack of a local coal mine may also have been a contributing factor.
