= Milton, Brown County, Illinois =

Milton, Illinois
- Former settlement
- Interactive map of Milton, Illinois
- Coordinates: 39°50′45″N 90°39′29″W
- Country: United States
- State: Illinois
- County: Brown
- Platted: August 26, 1836
- GNIS feature ID: 1828979

Milton is a former settlement in Brown County, Illinois, United States. The town was laid out August 25, 1836, by Lewis Gay, situated on the E. i of the S. E. of section 31, and the W. i of the S. W. I of section 32, near the site of the old Johnson mill, on McKee's creek, but it was a failure. Lewis Gay and William C. Ralls were the proprietors of the town, having laid out the town on McKee creek, five miles from the Illinois river. In the prospectus advertising the sale of town lots, the promoters referred to it as located at the head of slack water navigation.
