= Tacaogane, Illinois =

- Former settlement
- Interactive map of Tacaogane, Illinois
- Coordinates: 37°19′26″N 89°10′00″W
- Country: United States
- State: Illinois
- County: Massac
- GNIS feature ID: 1828986

Tacaogane is a former settlement possibly in Massac County or Pope County, Illinois, United States. It was shown on the 1684 map of Louisiana by Jean-Baptiste-Louis Franquelin. Franquelin places the settlement across the Ohio River from the mouths of the Tennessee and Cumberland rivers, though the exact nature and location of the settlement is unknown.

"Tacaogane" may be a corruption of an Iroquoian or Algonqian word referring to speakers of another language, though it is unclear which group this may refer to. William Nelson Moyers said the name means, "between two waters."

Despite its apparent proximity to Kincaid Mounds, it is unlikely that Tacaogane refers to a surviving Mississippian settlement in the late 17th century.
