= Cuba, Illinois =

City in Fulton County, Illinois

Cuba, Illinois Centerville Middletown
- City
- Nicknames: Cube, Cubie-town
- Location of Cuba in Fulton County, Illinois.

- Location within Fulton County Cuba, Illinois (Illinois)
- Coordinates: 40°29′37″N 90°11′36″W
- Country: United States
- State: Illinois
- County: Fulton
- Township: Putman
- Founded: 1818

Area
  - Total: 0.54 sq mi (1.41 km^{2})
  - Land: 0.54 sq mi (1.41 km^{2})
  - Water: 0 sq mi (0.00 km^{2})
- Elevation: 682 ft (208 m)

Population (2020)
  - Total: 1,184
  - Estimate (2024): 1,137
  - Density: 2,180/sq mi (841.6/km^{2})
- Time zone: UTC-6 (CST)
  - Summer (DST): UTC-5 (CDT)
- Postal code: 61427
- Area code: 309
- FIPS code: 17-17991
- GNIS ID: 2393689
- Website: cityofcubail.com

Cuba is a city in Fulton County, Illinois, United States. The population was 1,184 at the 2020 census.

== History ==
Historical photo of the United Electric Coal Co's. Cuba Mine near Cuba, Fulton Co., Illinois. Shown is the largest dirt moving machine in USA at the time (1946), used for strip mine operations during the mid 20th century. It could move 1,000 cubic yards of overburden in an hour. The overburden in Cuba is about 100 feet thick. The rotary shovel could take six cubic yards per minute.

Cuba was founded in 1837 when the two rival towns of Centerville and Middleton merged. The new town was named after the island of Cuba. The name could be in reference to the town of Havana, roughly 15 miles to the southeast. A post office has been in operation at Cuba since 1837.

== Geography ==
Cuba is located near the geographic center of Fulton County. Illinois Route 97 passes through the city, leading north 40 miles (64 km) to Galesburg and south 20 miles (32 km) to Havana on the Illinois River.

According to the 2021 census gazetteer files, Cuba has a total area of 0.54 square miles (1.40 km^{2}), all land.

== Demographics ==
Historical population
Census	Pop.	Note	%±
1860	348		—
1870	568		63.2%
1880	656		15.5%
1890	1,114		69.8%
1900	1,198		7.5%
1910	2,019		68.5%
1920	1,484		−26.5%
1930	1,479		−0.3%
1940	1,620		9.5%
1950	1,482		−8.5%
1960	1,380		−6.9%
1970	1,581		14.6%
1980	1,648		4.2%
1990	1,440		−12.6%
2000	1,418		−1.5%
2010	1,294		−8.7%
2020	1,184		−8.5%
U.S. Decennial Census

=== 2020 census ===
As of the 2020 census, Cuba had a population of 1,184 and 487 households, including 227 families. The population density was 2,180.48 inhabitants per square mile (841.89/km^{2}).

The median age was 42.8 years. 20.3% of residents were under the age of 18 and 21.1% of residents were 65 years of age or older. For every 100 females there were 91.0 males, and for every 100 females age 18 and over there were 86.6 males age 18 and over.

0.0% of residents lived in urban areas, while 100.0% lived in rural areas.

Of the 487 households, 29.6% had children under the age of 18 living in them. Of all households, 42.9% were married-couple households, 16.6% were households with a male householder and no spouse or partner present, and 28.7% were households with a female householder and no spouse or partner present. About 28.9% of all households were made up of individuals and 14.8% had someone living alone who was 65 years of age or older.

There were 540 housing units, of which 9.8% were vacant. The homeowner vacancy rate was 1.8% and the rental vacancy rate was 4.9%. Housing density was 994.48 per square mile (383.97/km^{2}).

Racial composition as of the 2020 census
Race	Number	Percent
White	1,136	95.9%
Black or African American	3	0.3%
American Indian and Alaska Native	1	0.1%
Asian	1	0.1%
Native Hawaiian and Other Pacific Islander	0	0.0%
Some other race	1	0.1%
Two or more races	42	3.5%
Hispanic or Latino (of any race)	13	1.1%

=== Income and poverty ===
The median income for a household in the city was $33,672, and the median income for a family was $60,313. Males had a median income of $34,375 versus $30,227 for females. The per capita income for the city was $25,716. About 11.9% of families and 18.0% of the population were below the poverty line, including 34.3% of those under age 18 and 5.3% of those age 65 or over.

== Notable people ==
- Paul H. Landis, sociologist
- Loren E. Murphy, chief justice of the Illinois Supreme Court
- William Harrison Nebergall, chemist who synthesized the fluoride compatible polishing agent calcium pyrophosphate.
- Harry K. Newburn, university president
