= Midway, Fulton County, Illinois =

Midway, Illinois
- Ghost town
- Location within Illinois
- Coordinates: 40°41′55″N 90°14′36″W
- Country: United States
- State: Illinois
- County: Fulton
- Elevation: 610 ft (190 m)
- GNIS feature ID: 1802231

Midway is a ghost town in Fulton County, Illinois, United States. Midway was 1.45 miles (2.33 km) southeast of London Mills.
