= Harry G. Day =

American chemist

Harry G. Day (October 8, 1906 – September 8, 2007) was an American chemist and professor. The Harry G. Day Lectureship in the chemistry building at Indiana University in Bloomington, Indiana, was established in 1988, and a lecture hall was dedicated to him in 1991.

== Research ==
While at Indiana University in the 1950s, Day, J.C. Muhler, and W.H Nebergall conducted research on the effects of fluorides in the reduction of dental cavities and tooth decay. The result of their research was Crest toothpaste, the first dentifrice toothpaste containing tin(II) fluoride.

== Organizational involvement ==
While working in the chemistry department at Indiana University Bloomington, Day was involved in the chemistry fraternity, Alpha Chi Sigma Epsilon chapter. He was the Epsilon chapter advisor for several years including 1942 and 1962–1968.

Day went on to make contributions to the American Institute of Nutrition, American Institute of Biological Chemists (where he took on the position of president), and the Indiana Academy of Science. He was also part of the American Chemical Society in 1954.

Day has also been involved with Kiwanis and Bloomington Hospital, where he was the first male to serve on the Women's Board. As an active Republican, he contributed on the Bloomington City Council in the 1960s. Dr. Harry G. Day has been assisting First United Methodist Church as a trustee. Elected to the city council, he served in that party for eight years up until 1971.

== Honours ==
In 1990, Day received the President's Medal of Excellence from Indiana University.

In 2002, he received the Kuebler Award. This award is named after John Kuebler, and is given to a member for outstanding service to the Alpha Chi Sigma fraternity and to the field of chemistry.

Day was named a Sagamore of the Wabash in 2004. The Sagamore of the Wabash is an honorary award created by the state of Indiana during the term of Governor Ralph F. Gates.

For his contributions to the chemistry department, Indiana University and the city of Bloomington, elected Dr. Harry G. Day to the Monroe County Hall of Fame.
