= Yates City, Illinois =

- Village
- Crest

- Location of Yates City in Knox County, Illinois
- Coordinates: 40°46′40″N 90°0′50″W
- Country: United States
- State: Illinois
- County: Knox
- Township: Salem
- Named for: Yates County, New York

Government
  - Village president: Ken Vallas

Area
  - Total: 0.49 sq mi (1.28 km^{2})
  - Land: 0.49 sq mi (1.28 km^{2})
  - Water: 0 sq mi (0.00 km^{2})
- Elevation: 673 ft (205 m)

Population (2020)
  - Total: 642
  - Density: 1,302.9/sq mi (503.07/km^{2})
- Time zone: UTC-6 (CST)
  - Summer (DST): UTC-5 (CDT)
- ZIP code: 61572
- Area code: 309
- FIPS code: 17-83817
- GNIS feature ID: 2399751
- Website: villageofyatescity.gov

Yates City is a village in Knox County, Illinois, United States. The population was 642 at the 2020 census. It is part of the Galesburg Micropolitan Statistical Area.

== History ==
Yates City was named after Yates County, New York.

== Notable people ==
- Clinton L. Ewing, Illinois state legislator, businessman, farmer, born in Yates City
- Owen B. West, Republican member of Illinois House of Representatives from 1915 to 1927, businessman, farmer, and former mayor of Yates City
- Bradley Wrage, 4th place in the 2012 State Farm MVC Outdoor Track & Field Championships clocking in at 9:14.31 in the 3000 meters steeplechase. Yates City hosted a celebration for Bradley's feat with a 1.5 mile parade of tractors.

== Geography ==
Yates City is in southeastern Knox County. Illinois Route 8 passes through the center of the village, leading east 2.5 miles (4.0 km) to Elmwood and west 7 miles (11 km) to Illinois Route 97 near Maquon. Galesburg, the Knox county seat, is 25 miles (40 km) northwest of Yates City.

According to the 2021 census gazetteer files, Yates City has a total area of 0.49 square miles (1.27 km^{2}), all land.

== Demographics ==
Historical population
Census	Pop.	Note	%±
1880	679		—
1890	687		1.2%
1900	650		−5.4%
1910	586		−9.8%
1920	582		−0.7%
1930	592		1.7%
1940	576		−2.7%
1950	623		8.2%
1960	802		28.7%
1970	840		4.7%
1980	860		2.4%
1990	760		−11.6%
2000	725		−4.6%
2010	693		−4.4%
2020	642		−7.4%
U.S. Decennial Census

As of the 2020 census there were 642 people, 338 households, and 202 families residing in the village. The population density was 1,302.23 inhabitants per square mile (502.79/km^{2}). There were 325 housing units at an average density of 659.23 per square mile (254.53/km^{2}). The racial makeup of the village was 95.17% White, 0.16% African American, 0.16% Native American, 0.16% Asian, 0.00% Pacific Islander, 0.00% from other races, and 4.36% from two or more races. Hispanic or Latino of any race were 0.78% of the population.

There were 338 households, out of which 29.6% had children under the age of 18 living with them, 39.94% were married couples living together, 15.09% had a female householder with no husband present, and 40.24% were non-families. 34.02% of all households were made up of individuals, and 10.95% had someone living alone who was 65 years of age or older. The average household size was 3.08 and the average family size was 2.43.

The village's age distribution consisted of 22.2% under the age of 18, 7.4% from 18 to 24, 31.5% from 25 to 44, 19.9% from 45 to 64, and 19.0% who were 65 years of age or older. The median age was 40.2 years. For every 100 females, there were 117.8 males. For every 100 females age 18 and over, there were 105.5 males.

The median income for a household in the village was $50,313, and the median income for a family was $66,786. Males had a median income of $37,333 versus $25,982 for females. The per capita income for the village was $29,083. About 6.4% of families and 10.7% of the population were below the poverty line, including 12.6% of those under age 18 and 3.2% of those age 65 or over.

== School districts ==
It is in the Farmington Central Community Unit School District 265.
