= Lists of renamed places =

These are lists of renamed places by country, sorted by continent.

== Africa ==
- Angola — List of renamed places in Angola
- Chad — List of renamed places in Chad
- DR Congo — List of renamed places in the Democratic Republic of the Congo
- Republic of the Congo — List of renamed places in the Republic of the Congo
- Eswatini — List of renamed places in Eswatini
- Gambia — List of renamed places in the Gambia
- Madagascar — List of renamed places in Madagascar
- Malawi — List of renamed places in Malawi
- Mozambique — List of renamed places in Mozambique
- Namibia — List of renamed places in Namibia
- South Africa — List of renamed places in South Africa
- Zambia — List of renamed places in Zambia
- Zimbabwe — List of renamed places in Zimbabwe

== Asia ==
- Armenia — List of renamed cities in Armenia
- Azerbaijan — List of cities renamed by Azerbaijan
- Bangladesh — List of renamed places in Bangladesh
- India — List of renamed places in India
  - Renaming of cities in India
- Iran — List of renamed cities in Iran
- Kazakhstan — List of renamed cities in Kazakhstan
- Kyrgyzstan — List of renamed cities in Kyrgyzstan
- Myanmar — List of renamed places in Myanmar
  - List of name changes in Yangon
- Pakistan — List of renamed places in Pakistan
- Philippines
  - List of renamed cities and municipalities in the Philippines
  - List of renamed streets in Metro Manila
- Russia — List of renamed cities and towns in Russia
- Tajikistan — List of renamed cities in Tajikistan
- Turkey
  - Place name changes in Turkey
- Turkmenistan — List of renamed cities in Turkmenistan
- Uzbekistan — List of renamed cities in Uzbekistan

== Europe ==
- Armenia — List of renamed cities in Armenia
- Azerbaijan — List of cities renamed by Azerbaijan
- Belarus — List of renamed cities in Belarus
- Estonia — List of renamed cities in Estonia
- Georgia — List of renamed cities in Georgia
- Greece
  - Geographical name changes in Greece
  - List of former toponyms in Drama Prefecture
  - List of former toponyms in Kavala Prefecture
  - List of former toponyms in Grevena Prefecture
  - List of former toponyms in Pella Prefecture
  - List of former toponyms in Pieria Prefecture
  - List of former toponyms in Imathia Prefecture
  - List of former toponyms in Xanthi Prefecture
  - List of former toponyms in Florina Prefecture
- Hungary — List of renamed places in Hungary
- Italy — List of renamed municipalities in Italy
- Kazakhstan — List of renamed cities in Kazakhstan
- Latvia — List of renamed cities in Latvia
- Lithuania — List of renamed cities in Lithuania
- Moldova — List of renamed populated places in Moldova
- Romania — List of renamed places in Romania
- Russia — List of renamed cities and towns in Russia
- Turkey
  - Place name changes in Turkey

Ukraine — List of renamed cities in Ukraine

  - List of Ukrainian placenames affected by decommunization
  - List of Ukrainian placenames affected by derussification
  - List of Ukrainian toponyms that were changed as part of decommunization in 2016
- United Kingdom
  - List of former Edinburgh street names

== North America ==
- United States — List of renamed places in the United States
  - List of former Atlanta street names
  - List of former place names in Brevard County, Florida
  - Neighborhood rebranding in New York City

== Oceania ==
- Australia
  - List of Australian place names changed from German names

== Other ==
- Geographical renaming
- List of administrative division name changes
- List of city name changes
