= List of renamed cities and towns in Russia =

This is a list of Russian towns and cities that were renamed.

== Background ==
Historical reasons behind geographical renaming were:

- A large number of cities and towns were renamed in Russia after the October Revolution of 1917
- More renamings happened during the whole history of the Soviet Union for political reasons
- In 1945, German cities around Königsberg were made part of the Kaliningrad Oblast exclave, see list of cities and towns in East Prussia
- After the reconquest of Southern Sakhalin in 1945, Japanese placenames were replaced with Russian ones.
- Circa 1972-73, many Chinese or Chinese-sounding place names in the Russian Far East were replaced with Russian-sounding ones.
- In 1991, after the dissolution of the Soviet Union, renamings (often for restoration of original names) happened, although infrequently.

== List ==
In the list below, sometimes the year of renaming appears in brackets after the new name.

- Abinsky → Abinsk (1963)
- Adygeysk (1969) → Teuchezhsk (1976) → Adygeysk (1992)
- Aksayskaya → Aksay (1957)
- Alexandria (1838) → Dakhovsky (1864) → Dakhovsky Posad (1874) → Sochi (1896)
- Alexandrovsk (1896) → Polyarny (1939)
- Alexandrovskaya → Alexandrovka → Alexandrovsky (1917) → Alexandrovsk-Sakhalinsky (1926)
- Alexandrovskoye (1860) → Alexandrovka (1926) → Krasnopartizansk (1931) → Kuybyshevka-Vostochnaya (1936) → Belogorsk (1957)
- Alexeyevsk (1912) → Svobodny (1917)
- Almetyevo → Almetyevsk
- Antrea → Kamennogorsk (1948)
- Apsheronskaya (1863) → Apsheronsk (1947)
- Armyansky Aul (1839) → Armavir (1848)
- Arzamas-16 (1946) → Kremlyov (1991) → Sarov (1995)
- Astapovo → Lev Tolstoy (1932)
- Balanda → Kalininsk (1962)
- Bashanta → Gorodovikovsk (1971)
- Batalpashinkaya (1804) → Batalpashinsk (1931) → Sulimov (1934) → Yezhovo-Cherkessk (1937) → Cherkessk (1939)
- Beloozero (862) → Belozersk (1777)
- Belorechenskaya (1863) → Belorechensk (1958)
- Beloretsk → Mezhgorye (1995)
- Belotsarsk (1914) → Khem-Beldyr (1918) → Kyzyl (1926)
- Bikinskaya → Bikin
- Biryuch (1905) → Budyonny (1919) → Krasnogvardeyskoye (1958) → Biryuch (2007)
- Bobriki → Donskoy
- Bobriki → Stalinogorsk (1934) → Novomoskovsk (1961)
- Bogdanovo → Spassk → Bednodemyanovsk (1925) → Spassk (2005)
- Bolokhovsky → Bolokhovo
- Bondyuzhsk (1885) → Bondyuzhsky (1928) → Mendeleyevsk (1967)
- Borovskaya Sloboda → Bor (1938)
- Beryozovskoye (Björkö) → Koivisto → Primorsk (1948)
- Chegem Pervy → Chegem
- Chembar → Belinsky (1948)
- Chertanla → Novyy Uzen' (1835) → Novouzensk
- Chesnokovka → Novoaltaysk (1962)
- Chelyabinsk-40 (1945) → Chelyabinsk-65 → Ozyorsk (1994)
- Chelyabinsk-70 → Snezhinsk (1991)
- Chibyu (1929) → Ukhta (1939)
- Chinnay → Krasnogorsk
- Cranz → Zelenogradsk (1945)
- Dalles (1924) → Lesozavodsk (1932)
- Darkehmen → Angerapp (1938) → Ozyorsk (1945)
- Derbinskoye (1880) → Tymovskoye (1945)
- Dmitriyev → Dmitriyev-na-Svape → Dmitriyev
- Dmitrovka (1711) → Dmitrovsk → Dmitrovsk-Orlovsky (1929) → Dmitrovsk (2005)
- Dokshukino (1913) → Nartkala (1967)
- Dolgoprudny → Dirizhablstroy → Dolgoprudny
- Dvigatelstroy → Kaspiysk (1947)
- Dzerzhinsky → Sorsk (1966)
- Elektroperedacha → Elektrogorsk (1946)
- Enso (1887) → Svetogorsk (1948)
- Esutoru → Uglegorsk (1946)
- Fischhausen → Primorsk (1946)
- Friedland → Pravdinsk (1946)
- Galkino-Vrasskoye (1884) → Ochiai (1905) → Dolinsk (1946)
- Goly Karamysh → Baltser → Krasnoarmeysk (1942)
- Gorodetsk → Bezhetsk (1766)
- Gorodok → Zakamensk (1959)
- Grushyovskaya → Gornoye Grushyovskoye → Alexandrovsk-Grushyovsky → Shakhty (1921)
- Gukovsky → Gukovo
- Gumbinnen → Gusev
- Gundorovka (1681) → Donetsk (1955)
- Gzhatsk (1718) → Gagarin (1968)
- Heiliegenbeil → Mamonovo (1945)
- Heinrichswalde → Slavsk
- Iletskaya Zashchita → Iletsk → Iletskoye → Iletskaya Zashchita → Sol-Iletsk
- Iman (1859) → Dalnerechensk (1972)
- Insterburg → Chernyakhovsk (1946)
- Ivanovo-Voznesensk → Ivanovo (1932)
- Izhevsky Zavod (1760) → Izhevsk (1807) → Ustinov (1984) → Izhevsk (1987)
- Izhma (1939) → Sosnogorsk (1957)
- Kainsk (1772) → Kuybyshev (1935)
- Kalata (1675) → Kirovgrad (1932)
- Kaliningrad (1938) → Korolyov (1996)
- Kamen → Kamen-na-Obi (1933)
- Kamenskaya → Kamensk-Shakhtinsky
- Kamensky Zavod → Kamensk-Uralsky
- Kamyshin (1667) → Dmitriyevsk (1710) → Kamyshin (1780)
- Kasivabora → Severo-Kurilsk
- Khabarovka → Khabarovsk
- Kharovsky → Kharovsk
- Khibinogorsk → Kirovsk, Murmansk Oblast
- Khlynov → Vyatka (1780) → Kirov (1934)
- Khonto (1789) → Nevelsk (1947)
- Khotchino → Gatchina → Trotsk (1923) → Krasnogvardeysk (1929) → Gatchina (1944)
- Khrushchyovskaya → Uzlovaya
- Kiyskoye → Kiysk (1856) → Mariinsk (1857)
- Kodinsky → Kodinsk
- Kolchugino (1763) → Lenino (1922) → Leninsk-Kuznetsky (1925)
- Komsomolsky (1962) → Yugorsk (1992)
- Korela → Keksgolm → Priozersk (1948)
- Korsakovsky Post → Otomari → Korsakov
- Kozlov (1635) → Michurinsk (1932)
- Königsberg → Kaliningrad (1946)
- Krasnaya Sloboda → Krasnoslobodsk
- Krasnoflotsky → Krasnoarmeysky → Krasnoarmeysk
- Krasnoyarsk-26 → Zheleznogorsk
- Kremlyov → Sarov (1995)
- Krestov Brod (1916) → Roshal (1917)
- Kseniyevsky (1896) → Asino (1930)
- Kudelka (1889) → Asbest (1928)
- Kukarka (1594) → Sovetsk (1937)
- Kurgannaya → Kurganinsk
- Kushvinsky Zavod → Kushva
- Kuznetsk (1618) → Novokuznetsk (1931) → Stalinsk (1932) → Novokuznetsk (1961)
- Kuznetsovo (1806) → Konakovo (1930)
- Labiau → Polessk (1946)
- Labinskaya → Labinsk
- Lagan (1870) → Kaspiysky (1944) → Lagan (1991)
- Lakinsky → Lakinsk
- Laptevo (1578) → Yasnogorsk (1965)
- Lazdinay (1734) → Lazdenen (1938) → Krasnoznamensk (1946)
- Lermontovsky → Lermontov
- Likhvin (1565) → Chekalin (1945)
- Lopasnya → Chyornoye Ozero → Chekhov
- Losinaya Sloboda → Losino-Petrovsky
- Lyantorsky → Lyantor
- Lyutoga → Rudaka → Aniva
- Maoka (Mauka) → Kholmsk
- Mechetnaya → Nikolayevsk → Pugachyov
- Medvezhyya Gora → Medvezhyegorsk
- Melekess → Dimitrovgrad (1972)
- Mikhaylovskoye → Shpakovskoye → Mikhaylovsk
- Mikhaylovsky Zavod → Mikhaylovsk
- Mikoyan-Shakhar → Klukhori → Karachayevsk
- Mukhtuya → Lensk
- Muravlenkovsky → Muravlenko
- Mysovaya → Mysovsk → Babushkin
- Naberezhnye Chelny → Brezhnev → Naberezhnye Chelny
- Nadezhdinsk → Kabakovsk → Nadezhdinsk → Serov
- Naykhoro → Gornozavodsk
- Nazyvayevskaya → Nazyvayevka → Nazyvayevsk
- Neuhausen → Guryevsk
- Nevdubstroy (1929) → Kirovsk (1953)
- Nevyansky Zavod → Nevyansk
- Nezametny (1923) → Aldan (1939)
- Nikolayevsky → Nikolayevsk → Nikolayevsk-na-Amure
- Nikolo-Pestrovka → Nikolo-Pestrovsky → Nikolsk
- Nikolskoye → Nikolsk → Nikolsk-Ussuriysky (1898) → Voroshilov (1935) → Ussuriysk (1957)
- Nikolsky Khutor (1860) → Sursk (1953)
- Nizhnetagilsky Zavod → Nizhny Tagil
- Nizhnevartovsky → Nizhnevartovsk
- Nizhnevolzhskoye (1963) → Nizhnevolzhsk (1967) → Narimanov (1984)
- Nizhniye Kresty → Chersky (1963)
- Nizhny Novgorod → Gorky (1932) → Nizhny Novgorod (1990)
- Noda → Chekhov (1947)
- Nolinsk (1668) → Molotovsk (1940) → Nolinsk (1957)
- Novaya Derevnya → Alexandrovsky → Novonikolayevsky → Novonikolayevsk → Novosibirsk (Novosibirsk)
- Novaya Pokrovka → Svoboda (1943) → Liski → Georgiu-Dezh (1965) → Liski (1990)
- Novgorod → Veliky Novgorod (1998)
- Novo-Mariinsk → Anadyr
- Novoalexandrovskaya → Novoalexandrovsk
- Novokuybyshevsky → Novokuybyshevsk
- Novopavlovskaya → Novopavlovsk
- Novotroitsk → Baley
- Novovoronezhsky → Novovoronezh
- Novy Zay → Zainsk
- Novye Petushki → Petushki
- Nyakh → Nyagan
- Obdorsk → Salekhard
- Olensk → Vilyuysk
- Olkhovsky → Artyomovsk
- Olzheras → Mezhdurechensk
- Omutninsky Zavod → Omutninsk
- Oraniyenbaum → Lomonosov
- Orenburg (1743) → Chkalov (1938) → Orenburg (1957)
- Oreshek → Nöteborg → Shlisselburg → Petrokrepost → Shlisselburg
- Orlov → Khalturin → Orlov
- Osinovka → Osinniki
- Ostyako-Vogulsk → Khanty-Mansiysk
- Pavlovo → Pavlovsky Posad
- Pavlovsk → Slutsk → Pavlovsk
- Pechory → Petseri → Pechory
- Pereyaslavl-Ryazansky → Ryazan
- Permskoye → Komsomolsk-na-Amure
- Pervomaysky → Novodvinsk
- Pesochnya → Kirov
- Petergof → Petrodvorets → Petergof
- Petropavlovsky → Petropavlovsky Port → Petropavlovsk-Kamchatsky
- Petropavlovsky → Severouralsk
- Petrovskoye → Petrovsk-Port → Makhachkala
- Petrovskoye → Svetlograd
- Petrovsky Zavod → Petrovsk-Zabaykalsky
- Pillau → Baltiysk
- Pokrovskaya → Pokrovsk → Engels
- Pokrovskoye → Pokrovsk
- Porechye → Demidov
- Poshekhonye → Poshekhonye-Volodarsk → Poshekhonye
- Prishib → Leninsk
- Protva → Zhukov
- Pryoysish-Elau → Bagrationovsk
- Pyora → Gondatti → Vladimiro-Shimanovsky → Shimanovsk
- Raduga → Vladimir-30 → Raduzhny
- Ragnit → Neman
- Ranenburg → Chaplygin
- Rastyapino → Dzerzhinsk
- Rauschen → Svetlogorsk
- Raychikha → Raychikhinsk
- Romanov-Borisoglebsk → Tutayev
- Romanov-na-Murmane → Murmansk (1917)
- Romanovsky → Kropotkin
- Saint Petersburg (1703) → Petrograd (1914) → Leningrad (1924) → Saint Petersburg (1991)
- Samara → Kuybyshev → Samara
- Selyutora → Siritoru → Makarov
- Semyonovka → Arsenyev
- Serdobol → Sortavala
- Sereda → Furmanov
- Sergiyev Posad → Sergiyev (1919) → Zagorsk (1930) → Sergiyev Posad (1991)
- Sergiyevskoye → Plavsk
- Shakhty → Gusinoozyorsk
- Shemchura → Tsarevosanchursk → Sanchursk
- Sharypovskoye → Sharypovo → Chernenko → Sharypovo
- Shcheglovo → Shcheglovsk → Kemerovo
- Shikhrany → Kanash
- Shkotovo-17 → Tikhookeansky → Fokino
- Sieklakhti → Lakhdenpokhya
- Simbirsk → Ulyanovsk
- Skalisty → Gadzhiyevo
- Slavyanskaya → Slavyansk-na-Kubani
- Solnechnogorsky → Solnechnogorsk
- Sorochinskoye → Sorochinsk
- Spassk → Spassk-Tatarsky → Kuybyshev → Bolgar
- Spasskoye → Spassk → Spassk-Dalny
- Spasskoye → Spassk → Spassk-Ryazansky
- Stakhanovo → Zhukovsky
- Stallupönen → Nesterov
- Stary Rogozhsky Yam → Bogorodsk → Noginsk
- Stavropol → Tolyatti
- Stavropol → Voroshilovsk → Stavropol
- Stupinskaya → Elektrovoz → Stupino
- Suchansky Rudnik → Suchan → Partizansk
- Sudostroy → Molotovsk → Severodvinsk
- Sundyr → Mariinsky Posad
- Suyetikha → Biryusinsk
- Sverdlovsk-45 → Lesnoy
- Svobodny → Cherepanovo
- Svyatoy Krest → Prikumsk → Budyonnovsk → Prikumsk → Budyonnovsk
- Syana → Kurilsk
- Sysertsky Zavod → Sysert
- Taldom → Leninsk → Taldom
- Tapiau → Gvardeysk
- Tashino → Pervomaysk
- Temir-Khan-Shura → Buynaksk
- Terijoki → Zelenogorsk
- Tetyukhe → Dalnegorsk
- Tikhmenevsky → Sikuka → Poronaysk
- Tikhoretskaya → Tikhoretsk
- Tilsit → Sovetsk
- Tomarioru → Tomari
- Tomsk-7 → Seversk
- Toro → Shakhtyorsk
- Troitsa → Udomlya
- Troitsko-Zaozyornoye → Zaozyorny
- Troitskosavsk → Kyakhta
- Troitskoye → Troitsky → Troitsk
- Trongzund → Uuras → Trongzund → Vysotsk
- Ivashchenkovo (1909) → Trotsk (1927) → Chapayevsk (1929)
- Truyevo-Naryshkino → Kuznetsk
- Tsaritsyn (1589) → Stalingrad (1925) → Volgograd (1961)
- Tsarskoye Selo → Detskoye Selo → Pushkin
- Tsaryovokokshaysk → Krasnokokshaysk → Yoshkar-Ola
- Tsimlyanskaya → Tsimlyansk
- Tulatovo → Iriston → Beslan
- Turyinsky → Krasnoturyinsk
- Tver → Kalinin (1931) → Tver (1990)
- Tyndinsky → Tynda
- Udinskoye→ Udinsk (1735) → Verkhneudinsk (1783) → Ulan-Ude
- Ulala → Oyrot-Tura → Gorno-Altaysk
- Uralmedstroy → Krasnouralsk
- Usolye → Usolye-Sibirskoye
- Ust-Abakanskoye → Khakassk → Abakan
- Ust-Belokalitvenskaya → Belaya Kalitva
- Ust-Katavsky Zavod → Ust-Katav
- Ust-Medveditskaya → Serafimovich
- Ust-Sheksna → Rybansk → Rybnaya Sloboda (1504) → Rybnoy → Rybinsk (1777) → Shcherbakov (1946) → Rybinsk (1957) → Andropov (1984) → Rybinsk (1989)
- Ust Zeysky military post → Blagoveshchensk
- Vasilyovo → Chkalovsk
- Vayenga → Severomorsk
- Velikoknyazheskaya → Proletarskaya → Proletarsk
- Velyaminovsky → Tuapse
- Vinodelnoye → Ipatovo
- Vladikavkaz → Ordzhonikidze → Dzaudzhikau → Ordzhonikidze → Vladikavkaz
- Vladimirovka → Toyokhara → Yuzhno-Sakhalinsk
- Volkhovstroy → Volkhov (1940)
- Volna-Khristianovsky → Novokhristianovskoye → Khristianovskoye → Digora
- Volodary → Volodarsk
- Vorontsovo-Alexandrovskoye → Sovetskoye → Zelenokumsk
- Voskresenskoye → Voskresensk → Istra (not to be confused with another Voskresensk)
- Voznesenskaya → Vereshchagino
- Vyzhaikha → Krasnovishersk
- Yagoshikha (1723) → Perm (1781) → Molotov (1940) → Perm (1957)
- Yakovlevskoye → Privolzhsk
- Yama → Yamsky Gorodok → Yama → Yamburg → Kingisepp (1922)
- Yauntlatgale → Abrene → Pytalovo
- Yegorshino → Artyomovsky
- Yekaterinburg (Екатеринбург) → Sverdlovsk (1924)→ Yekaterinburg
- Yekaterinodar (1794) → Krasnodar (1920)
- Yekaterinenstadt (Baronsk) → Marxstadt → Marks
- Yuryuzansky Zavod → Yuryuzan
- Zaozyorny-13 → Krasnoyarsk-45 → Zelenogorsk (1992)
- Zarinskaya → Zarinsk
- Zatishye → Elektrostal
- Zavolzhye → Zavolzhsk
- Zavoyko → Yelizovo
- Zernovoy → Zernograd
- Zeysky Sklad → Zeya-Pristan → Zeya
- Zhdanovsk → Zapolyarny
- Zheleznodorozhny → Yemva
- Zhirnoye → Zhirnovsky → Zhirnovsk
- Zimmerbude → Svetly
- Zlatoust-36 → Tryokhgorny
- Zmeiny → Never-1 → Rukhlovo → Skovorodino

== See also ==
- List of inhabited localities in Kaliningrad Oblast, with former names from East Prussia (list)
- List of places named after Lenin
- List of places named after Stalin
- List of renamed cities in Armenia
- List of renamed cities in Azerbaijan
- List of renamed cities in Belarus
- List of renamed cities in Estonia
- List of renamed cities in Georgia
- List of renamed cities in Kazakhstan
- List of renamed cities in Kyrgyzstan
- List of renamed cities in Latvia
- List of renamed cities in Lithuania
- List of renamed cities in Moldova
- List of renamed cities in Tajikistan
- List of renamed cities in Turkmenistan
- List of renamed cities in Uzbekistan
- List of renamed cities in Ukraine
- List of names of European cities in different languages
- List of Asian city names in different languages
