= List of renamed places in Chad =

This is a list of renamed places in Chad

== Cities and towns ==
- Faya → Largeau → Faya-Largeau (1960)
- Fort-Foureau → Kousséri
- Fort-Lamy → N'Djamena (1973)
- Fort-Archambault → Sarh

=== Proposed ===
- Faya-Largeau → Faya

== See also ==
- Geographical renaming
- Lists of renamed places
- List of city name changes
