= List of renamed places in Madagascar =

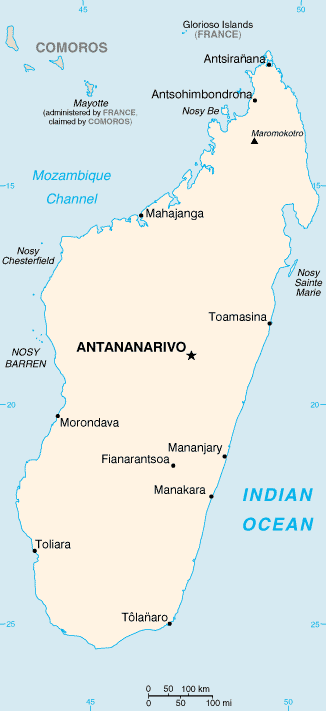
Map of Madagascar displaying major cities

This is a list of renamed places in Madagascar.

For most of these places the French name is still commonly used, including in administrative papers and nameplates on public places.

== Cities and towns ==
- Hell-Ville → Andoany
- Antananarivo → Tananarive (1895) → Antananarivo (1976)
- Diego-Suarez → Antsiranana (1975)
- Port Bergé → Boriziny
- Fénérive Est → Fenoarivo Atsinanana
- Majunga → Mahajanga (1989)
- Assada → Nosy Be
- Île Sainte-Marie → Nosy Boraha
- Joffreville → Ambohitra
- Tamatave → Toamasina
- Taolankarana → Fort-Dauphin (1643) → Tolanaro (1975)
- Tuléar → Toliara (1970s)
- Brickaville → Vohibinany
- Périnet → Andasibe, Moramanga
- Port Saint-Louis → Antsohimbondrona (Diana)
- Babetville → Ankadinondry Sakay
- Foulpointe → Mahavelona
- Saint Augustin, Madagascar → Ianantsony

== See also ==
- Lists of renamed places
