= List of renamed cities in Iran =

The following is a list of cities in Iran that have undergone a name change in the recent past. Many more however have at least one Ancient and/or other historical name(s).

Rank	Former name	Present name
1	Qaradağ	Arasbaran
2	Khiyov	Meshginshahr
3	Lahijan	Piranshahr
4	Mugan	3 Cities Germi, Parsabad and Bileh Savar
5	Malek Kandi	Malekan
6	Üçkaya	Osku
7	Saraskand	Hashtrud
8	Khorasan	Sain Qaleh
9	Qoşaçay	Miandoab
10	Suldoz	Naqadeh
11	Urmia	Orumiyeh
12	Takan Tepe	Takab
13	Seneh	Sanandaj
14	Dilmagan and Shapur	Salmas
15	Araplar	Poldasht
16	Kara Aineh and Qareh Eyni	Siah Cheshmeh
17	Saujbulagh	Mahabad
18	Shahi, Ali abad (Note: The name Ali abad was replaced by Shahi in 1934 and to Qaem Shahr after the 1979 revolution)	Qaemshahr
19	Bandar-e Pahlavi (Note: The name Bandar-e Pahlavi was used during the Pahlavi dynasty, the previous name of Anzali returned after the 1979 revolution)	Bandar-e Anzali
20	Kivi	Kowsar
21	Hussainabad	Ilam
22	Mansorabad	Mehran
23	Yaylagh	Qorveh
24	Bandar Shahpur	Bandar-e Imam Khomeyni

== See also ==
- List of city name changes (worldwide, by country)
- List of renamed cities in Armenia
- List of renamed cities in Georgia
