= List of renamed places in Zambia =

This is a list of renamed places in Zambia. After independence, a number of cities and towns were renamed.

== Country ==
The country now known as Zambia was known as Northern Rhodesia from 1911. It was renamed Zambia at independence in 1964. The new name was derived from the Zambezi river.

== Cities and towns ==
- Fife → Nakonde pre-independence
- Balovale → Zambezi
- Bancroft → Chililabombwe (1967)
- Fort Jameson → Chipata (1967)
- Broken Hill → Kabwe (1967)
- Feira → Luangwa (1964)
- Fort Rosebery → Mansa (1967)
- Abercorn → Mbala (1967)

=== Proposed ===
The following name changes have been proposed but not actually implemented:

- Livingstone → Mosi-O-Tunya

== Airports ==
- Copperbelt International Airport → Simon Mwansa Kapwepwe International Airport (2021)
- Livingstone International Airport → Harry Mwanga Nkumbula International Airport (2011)
- Lusaka International Airport → Kenneth Kaunda International Airport (2011)
- Ndola International Airport → Simon Mwansa Kapwepwe International Airport (2011) → Peter Zuze Air Force Base (2021)

== Streets ==
- Cecil Avenue (in Lusaka) → Independence Avenue (1964)

== See also ==
- Lists of renamed places
