= List of renamed places in Malawi =

This is a list of renamed places in Malawi.

== Country ==
The British colony of Nyasaland was renamed Malawi upon independence in 1964.

== Cities and towns ==
- Fort Hill → Chitipa (1964)
- Fort Johnston → Mangochi (1964)
- Fort Manning → Mchinji (1964)
- Mlanje → Mulanje
- Kota Kota → Nkhotakota
- Port Herald → Nsanje
- Fort Lister → Phalombe (1964)

== See also ==
- Lists of renamed places
