= List of renamed places in Eswatini =

This is a list of renamed places in Eswatini (Swaziland).

== Country ==
- Swaziland → Eswatini (2018)

== Cities ==
- Havelock Mine → Bulembu (1991)
- Bremersdorp → Manzini (1960)
- Buffelspruit → Mhlambanyatsi
- Goedgegun → Nhlangano

== See also ==
- Lists of renamed places
- List of city name changes
