= List of renamed places in the Gambia =

This is a list of renamed places in the Gambia.

- Bathurst → Banjul (1973)
- Georgetown → Janjanbureh
- James Island → Kunta Kinteh Island (2011)
- MacCarthy Island → Janjanbureh Island (1995)

== See also ==
- Lists of renamed places
