= List of renamed places in the Republic of the Congo =

This is a list of renamed places in the Republic of the Congo.

== Cities ==
- Ncouna → Brazzaville (1884)
- Dolisie → Loubomo (1975) → Dolisie (1991)
- Jacob → Nkayi (1975)
- Rousset (1903) → Fort-Rousset (1904) → Owando (1977)
- Ponta Negra → Pointe-Noire

== See also ==
- Lists of renamed places
- List of city name changes
