= Geographical renaming =

Change of name of a geographical entity

Geographical renaming is the changing of the name of a geographical feature or area, which ranges from the change of a street name to a change to the name of a country. Places are also sometimes assigned dual names for various reasons.

== Background ==
A change might see a completely different name being adopted or may only be a slight change in spelling. Some names are changed locally but the new names are not recognised by other countries, especially when there is a difference in language. Other names may not be officially recognised but remain in common use. Many places have different names in different languages, and a change of language in official or general use has often resulted in what is arguably a change of name. There are many reasons to undertake renaming, with political motivation being the primary cause; for example many places in the former Soviet Union and its satellites were renamed to honour Stalin. Sometimes a place reverts to its former name (see, for example, de-Stalinization).

One of the most common reasons for a country changing its name is newly acquired national independence. When borders are changed, sometimes due to a country splitting or two countries joining, the names of the relevant areas can change. This, however, is more the creation of a different entity than an act of geographical renaming.

Place names may revert to an earlier name; for instance in Australia, pre-colonial names established thousands of years ago by Aboriginal peoples have been reclaimed as official names. Examples include K'gari (formerly Fraser Island and various other names since settlement), and Uluru / Ayers Rock, where a dual naming strategy was adopted but it is now commonly known as Uluru.

Other more unusual reasons for renaming have included getting rid of an inappropriate or embarrassing name, or as part of a sponsorship deal or publicity stunt.

In some cases established institutions preserve the old names of the renamed places in their names, such as the Pusan National University in Busan, South Korea; the Peking University in Beijing; Bombay Stock Exchange, IIT Bombay and the Bombay High Court in Mumbai; University of Madras, Madras Stock Exchange, the Madras High Court, and IIT Madras in Chennai; the University of Malaya, Keretapi Tanah Melayu, in Malaysia; and SWAPO (South West Africa People's Organization), the ruling party of Namibia. Often the older name will persist in colloquial expressions. For example, the dish known in English as "Peking duck" retained that name even when the Chinese capital changed its transliteration to "Beijing".

== Romanisation ==
Changes in romanisation systems can result in minor or major changes in spelling in the Roman alphabet for geographical entities, even without any change in name pronunciation or spelling in the local alphabet or other writing system. Names in non-Roman characters can also be spelled very differently when Romanised in different European languages.

=== Chinese names ===
China developed and adopted the Pinyin romanisation system in February 1958 in place of previous systems such as the postal romanization and Wade–Giles. Many Chinese geographical entities (and associated entities named after geographical names) thus had their English names changed. The changes sometimes appear drastic, since it is sometimes the case that the former romanisations were derived from Cantonese—the common language in British-held Hong Kong—while the newer romanisations are derived entirely from Mandarin. However, the pronunciation in Mandarin has mostly stayed the same both before and after the change. Pinyin was adopted by the International Organization for Standardization in 1982 and officially adopted in Singapore (resulting in several geographical name changes of its own). However it is usually not applied in the autonomous regions of the PRC (e.g. Lhasa, Ürümqi, Hohhot, Xigazê, Ili, Altay, Kaxgar, Hulunbuir, Erenhot, with a notable exception being place names in Ningxia, whose native Hui people speak Mandarin as their native language) and has not resulted in any geographical name change in the SARs of Hong Kong and Macau. It is adopted only in parts of Taiwan, particularly within Taipei and other Kuomintang controlled cities and counties, in a recent push to adopt Pinyin by the Kuomintang government.

Examples of changes:

In the People's Republic of China

- Peking → Beijing
- Canton → Guangdong and Guangzhou
- Nanking → Nanjing
- Sian → Xi'an
- Chengtu → Chengdu
- Chungking → Chongqing
- Tientsin → Tianjin
- Sinkiang → Xinjiang
- Heilungkiang → Heilongjiang
- Szechuan → Sichuan

In the Republic of China (Taiwan)

- Shih-lin → Shilin
- Chung-cheng → Zhongzheng
- Tamsui → Danshui (now reverted)

In Singapore

- Peck San → Bishan
- Ao Kang → Hougang
- Nee Soon → Yishun

=== Korean names ===
The introduction of the Revised Romanization of Korean in place of the McCune–Reischauer system on 7 July 2000 by the South Korean government has resulted in a string of changes to geographical names. The system is not used by North Korea. Examples of changes include:

- Inch'ŏn → Incheon
- Kyŏngju → Gyeongju
- Pusan → Busan
- Taegu → Daegu
- Taejŏn → Daejeon

== Endonyms and exonyms ==
For geographical entities with multiple pre-existing names in one or more languages, an exonym or endonym may gradually be substituted and used in the English language.

- Many countries have intentionally had their common English names officially changed to the local name, such as Côte d'Ivoire and Timor-Leste's translations to their local languages, or Persia requesting to be known by the endonym Iran, and Mesopotamia being changed to Iraq.
- Transfer of a city between countries speaking different languages can result in seeming changes of name. Changes can be as slight as Straßburg (Germany) and Strasbourg (France). Some are less subtle: Thessaloniki, built in 4th century BC in ancient Macedonia became Selanik during the Ottoman Empire and has sometimes been referred to as Salonica, and is now Thessaloniki in Greece; Pilsen in the Austro-Hungarian Empire became Plzeň in Czechoslovakia; Chișinău, now the capital of Moldova, was in Russian and Soviet times part of Romania and known as Kishinev (the latter name is used in English in certain historical contexts, e.g. Kishinev pogrom). Some are translations; Karlsbad become Karlovy Vary.
- When the formerly-German city of Stettin came under Polish rule, it became known in English by its Polish name of Szczecin. But when Winston Churchill gave his Iron Curtain speech he still spoke of the city by its German name instead of its contemporary Polish name even though Churchill fully accepted the transfer of the formerly-German city to Poland, probably because it is German phonology, not Polish, that is closer to English. The pattern is far from uniform, and it takes time.
- The Soviet Union replaced German city names in the former East Prussia that became the Kaliningrad Oblast and Japanese place names in southern Sakhalin Island with Russian names unrelated to the old German and Japanese place names after annexing them in the aftermath of World War II.
- The military junta changed the official English name of Burma to Myanmar in 1988, even though both were pre-existing names which originated from the Burmese language and used interchangeably depending on contexts (see Names of Myanmar).
- Decolonisation in India saw a trend to change the established English names of cities to the names in the local language. Since then, changes have included Chennai (from Madras in August 1996), Kolkata (from Calcutta in January 2001) and Mumbai (from Bombay in 1995), amongst many others.
- The People's Republic of China, upon its founding and new nationalities policy, changed the names of cities in ethnic minority regions from sometimes patronising Chinese language names to those of the native language. For example, it changed Dihua to Ürümqi and Zhenxi to Barkol.
- After the occupation of the communist North Vietnam at the end of the Vietnam War, the city of Saigon changed its name to Ho Chi Minh City (after the late leader of North Vietnam Ho Chi Minh) to symbolize the north's victory in the war. Despite the official name change, however, many older Americans (especially those who fought in the Vietnam War) still refer to the city as Saigon. Even many Vietnamese still refer to the city as Saigon, as it is shorter. The name of the river, however, remains unchanged, the Saigon River.

== Changes resulting from splits and mergers ==
- Czechoslovakia got its name from the agglomeration of the Czech and Slovak peoples in 1918. It peacefully dissolved into the Czech Republic and the Slovak Republic in 1993.
- Yugoslavia ("Land of the South Slavs") was originally Kingdom of Serbs, Croats and Slovenes, created by joining Kingdom of Serbia, Kingdom of Montenegro and parts of Austro-Hungarian Empire inhabited by South Slavs (today comprising Croatia, Bosnia and Herzegovina, Slovenia and Vojvodina (i.e. the Northern part of modern Serbia)). It became Yugoslavia in 1929. It subsequently split into the modern states of Serbia, Croatia, Bosnia and Herzegovina, Slovenia, North Macedonia and Montenegro between 1991 and 2006. Kosovo unilaterally declared its independence in 2008.
- The Gambia and Senegal became one as Senegambia Confederation 1982–1989.
- Tanganyika and Zanzibar joined to become Tanzania.
- Egypt and Syria were briefly joined as the United Arab Republic.
- Malaya merged with the northern Borneo territories of Sabah and Sarawak, and Singapore to form Malaysia in 1963. Singapore was expelled from Malaysia in 1965.
- Various places split by compass directions, such as North and South Dakota, West Virginia and Virginia, North and South Korea, East and West Germany, South Sudan and Sudan, etc. South Yemen was previously known as the Aden Protectorate and by other names. Some of these were subsequently unified, such as Germany and Yemen.

== List of significant name changes ==
This is a list of internationally important or significant renamings.

=== Countries ===
The British government records changes of countries' names.

- New Spain → Mexico (1821)
- Upper Peru → Bolivia (1825)
- Republic of the Seven United Netherlands → Batavian Republic (1795) → Batavian Commonwealth (1801) → Kingdom of Holland (1806) → Sovereign Principality of the United Netherlands (1813) → United Kingdom of the Netherlands (1815) → Kingdom of the Netherlands (1830)
- New Grenada → Colombia (1819) → New Granada (1831) → Colombia (1863)
- Spanish East Indies → Philippines (1898)
- Kingdom of Great Britain → United Kingdom of Great Britain and Ireland (1801) → United Kingdom of Great Britain and Northern Ireland (1927)
- Pindotetama → Pindorama/Tapuiretama (disputed) → Ilha de Vera Cruz (1500) → Terra de Santa Cruz (1500) → Portuguese Brazil (1530) → Dutch Brazil (1630–1654) → United Kingdom of Portugal, Brazil and the Algarves (1815) → Empire of Brazil (1822) → Republic of the United States of Brazil (1889) → Brazil (1930)
- Kingdom of Hejaz and Nejd → Saudi Arabia (1932)
- Abyssinia → Ethiopia (1941)
- Dutch East Indies → Indonesia (1945 or 1949)
- Transjordan → Jordan (1946)
- Siam → Thailand (1939) → Siam (1945) → Thailand (1947)
- Irish Republic → Irish Free State (1922) → Ireland (1949)
- Gold Coast → Ghana (1957)
- Ubangi-Shari → Central African Republic (1958)
- French Sudan → Mali (1960)
- United Republic of Tanganyika and Zanzibar → Tanzania (1964)
- Nyasaland → Malawi (1964)
- Northern Rhodesia → Zambia (1964)
- Southern Rhodesia → Rhodesia (1964) → Zimbabwe-Rhodesia (1979) → Zimbabwe (1980)
- Sabara or Sabana (disputed) → Temasek (unknown) → Singapura (1299 or 1389) → British Singapore (1819) → Syonan-to (Syonan Island) (1942) → Colony of Singapore (1945) → State of Singapore (1959) → State of Singapore (Malaysia) (1963) → Singapore (1965)
- British Guiana → Guyana (1966)
- Bechuanaland → Botswana (1966)
- Basutoland → Lesotho (1966)
- German Southwest Africa → Southwest Africa (1915) → Namibia (1968)
- Spanish Guinea → Equatorial Guinea (1968)
- Muscat and Oman → Oman (1970)
- Eastern Bengal and Assam (1905) → East Bengal (1947) → East Pakistan (1955) → Bangladesh (1971)
- Ceylon → Sri Lanka (1972)
- British Honduras → Belize (1973)
- Portuguese Guinea → Guinea-Bissau (1974)
- Spanish Possessions in the Sahara → Spanish West Africa (1946) → Province of the Sahara (1958) → Western Sahara (1975)
- Colony of Surinam → Country of Suriname (1954) → Suriname (1975)
- Median Empire → Achaemenid Empire (550 BC) → Seleucid Empire (312 BC) → Parthian Empire (247 BC) → Sasanid Empire (224 AD) → Tahirid Empire (821) → Saffarid Empire (861) → Samanid Empire (819) → Ghaznavid Empire (977) → Seljuk Empire (1037) → Khwarazmian Empire (1077) → Il Khanate (1256) → Muzaffarid Empire (1314) → Timurid Empire (1370) → Safavid Empire (1501) → Afsharid Empire (1736) → Zand Empire (1751) → Sublime State of Persia (1789) → Imperial State of Persia (1925) → Imperial State of Iran (1935) → Islamic Republic of Iran (1979)
- Ellice Islands → Tuvalu (1978)
- Gilbert Islands → Kiribati (1979)
- New Hebrides → Vanuatu (1980)
- Volta (or Upper Volta) (1958) → Burkina Faso (1984)
- Ivory Coast → Republic of Côte d'Ivoire (1986)
- Burma → Myanmar (1989; disputed)
- Dahomey → French Dahomey (1894) → Republic of Dahomey (1958) → People's Republic of Benin (1975) → Benin (1990)
- Belarusian Democratic Republic → Byelorussian SSR (1919) → Republic of Belarus (1991)
- Bessarabia → Moldavian SSR (1940) → Republic of Moldova (1991)
- Kara-Kirghiz Autonomous Oblast → Kirghiz ASSR (1926) → Kirghiz SSR (1936) → Socialist Republic of Kyrgyzstan (1990) → Republic of Kyrgyzstan (1990) → Kyrgyz Republic (1991)
- Tsardom of Russia → Russian Empire (1721) → Russian Republic (1917) → Russian Soviet Federative Socialist Republic (1917) → Russian Federation (1991)
- Kazakh ASSR → Kazakh ASSR (1925) → Kazakh SSR (1936) → Republic of Kazakhstan (1991)
- Kingdom of Cambodia → Khmer Republic (1970) → Democratic Kampuchea (1975) → People's Republic of Kampuchea (1979) → State of Cambodia (1989) → Kingdom of Cambodia (1993)
- Congo Free State → Belgian Congo (1908) → Republic of the Congo (1960) → Democratic Republic of the Congo (1964) → Zaïre (1971) → Democratic Republic of the Congo (1997)
- Western Samoa Trust Territory → Western Samoa (1962) → Samoa (1997)
- Portuguese Timor → Timor Timur (1975) → Timor-Leste (2002)
- Kingdom of Serbs, Croats and Slovenes → Kingdom of Yugoslavia (1929) → Democratic Federal Yugoslavia (1943) → Federal People's Republic of Yugoslavia (1945) → Socialist Federal Republic of Yugoslavia (1963) → Federal Republic of Yugoslavia (1992) → State Union of Serbia and Montenegro (2003) → Republic of Serbia (2006)
- Cape Verde → Cabo Verde (2013)
- Swaziland → Eswatini (2018)
- Democratic Federal Macedonia (1944) → People's Republic of Macedonia (1946) → Socialist Republic of Macedonia (1963) → Republic of Macedonia (1991) → Republic of North Macedonia (2019)
- Republic of Turkey → Republic of Türkiye (2023)
- Republic of Nauru → Republic of Naoero (2026)

=== Partially recognized states ===
- Turkish Cypriot General Committee (1967) → Autonomous Turkish Cypriot Administration (1974) → Turkish Federated State of Cyprus (1975) → Turkish Republic of Northern Cyprus (1983)
- Kosovo and Metohija → Kosovo (2008)
- Nagorno-Karabakh Republic → Republic of Artsakh (2017)
- Republic of South Ossetia → Republic of South Ossetia – the State of Alania (2017)

=== Subnational entities ===
Australia

- Van Diemen's Land → Tasmania (1856)

Bangladesh

- Dacca → Dhaka (1983)
- Barisal → Barishal (2018)
- Chittagong → Chattogram (2018)

Belgium

- Lys → West-Vlaanderen (1815)
- Meuse-Inférieure → Limburg (1815)
- Escaut → Oost-Vlaanderen (1815)
- Jemappes → Henegouwen (1815) → Hainaut (1830)
- Dyle → Zuid-Brabant (1815) → Brabant (1831)

Brazil

- Guaporé → Rondônia (1956)
- Rio Branco → Roraima (1962)

Canada

- Province of Newfoundland → Province of Newfoundland and Labrador (2001)
- Queen Charlotte Islands → Haida Gwaii (2010)

China

- Chih-li (Zhili) → Hebei (1928)

Cuba

- Santa Clara province → Las Villas province (1940) → split into Villa Clara, Sancti Spiritus and Cienfuegos provinces (1976)
- Camagüey province → split into Camagüey, and Ciego de Ávila provinces (1976)
- Oriente province → Santiago de Cuba province (1878) → Oriente province (1904) → split into Las Tunas, Holguín, Granma, Santiago de Cuba and Guantánamo provinces (1976)
- La Habana province → split into La Habana, and Ciudad de La Habana provinces (1976).
- La Habana province → split into Artemisa, and Mayabeque provinces (2011)
- Ciudad de La Habana province → La Habana province (Havana) (2011)
- Isla de Pinos (Isle of Pines) → Isla de la Juventud (Isle of Youth) island (1978).

France

- Mayenne-et-Loire → Maine-et-Loire (1791)
- Bec-d'Ambès → Gironde (1795)
- Charente-Inférieure → Charente-Maritime (1941)
- Seine-Inférieure → Seine-Maritime (1955)
- Loire-Inférieure → Loire-Atlantique (1957)
- Basses-Pyrénées → Pyrénées-Atlantiques (1969)
- Basses-Alpes → Alpes-de-Haute-Provence (1970)
- Côtes-du-Nord → Côtes-d'Armor (1990)

India

- Dremoshong → Sikkim (1800s)
- Madras State → Tamil Nadu (1968)
- Mysore → Karnataka (1973)
- Bombay → Mumbai (1995)
- New Bombay → Navi Mumbai (1995)
- Madras → Chennai (1996)
- Calcutta → Kolkata (2001)
- Pondicherry → Puducherry (2006)
- Orissa → Odisha (2011)

Indonesia

- Irian Barat → Irian Jaya (1973) → Papua (2001)
- Irian Jaya Barat → Papua Barat (2007)
- Aceh Darussalam → Daerah Istimewa Aceh (1959) → Nanggroë Aceh Darussalam (2001) → Aceh (2009)

Ireland

- King's County → County Offaly (1922)
- Queen's County → County Laois (1922)
- County Tyreconnell → County Donegal (1927)

Kazakhstan

- South Kazakhstan → Turkistan Region (2018)
- Akmolinsk (1830) → Tselinograd (1961) → Aqmola (1992) → Astana (1998) → Nur-Sultan (2019) → Astana (2022)

Malaysia

- British North Borneo → Sabah (1963)
- Prang Besar → Putrajaya (1999)

Mexico

- Nueva Galicia → Jalisco (1824)
- Nuevo Santander → Tamaulipas (1824)

Netherlands

- Bouches-de-l'Escaut → Zeeland (1815)
- Bouches-de-l'Yssel → Overijssel (1815)
- Meuse-Inférieure → Limburg (1815)

Pakistan

- Nawabshah District → Shaheed Benazirabad District (2008)
- Northern Areas → Gilgit–Baltistan (2009)
- North West Frontier Province → Khyber Pakhtunkhwa (2010)

Russia

- Kuibyshev Oblast → Samara Oblast (1991)

South Africa

- Natal → KwaZulu-Natal (1994)
- Eastern Transvaal → Mpumalanga (1995)
- Orange Free State → Free State (1995)
- Pretoria-Witwatersrand-Vereeniging → Gauteng (1995)
- Northern Transvaal → Northern Province (1995) → Limpopo (2003)

Turkey

Switzerland

- Léman → Genève (1815)
- Simplon → Valais (1815)

United Kingdom

- Londonderry City Council → Derry City Council (1984; disputed) (Note: renaming of Londonderry to Derry remains highly controversial. According to the city's royal charter of 10 April 1662 the official name is Londonderry. This was reaffirmed in a High Court decision in January 2007 when Derry City Council sought guidance on the procedure for effecting a name change. The name Derry is preferred by nationalists and it is broadly used throughout Northern Ireland's Catholic community, as well as that of the Republic of Ireland, whereas many unionists prefer Londonderry; however in everyday conversation Derry is used by most Protestant residents of the city. Apart from this local government decision, the city is usually known as Londonderry in official use within the United Kingdom. In the Republic of Ireland, the city and county are almost always referred to as Derry, on maps, in the media and in conversation.)
- Shropshire → Salop (1974) → Shropshire (1980)

United States

- State of Massachusetts Bay → Commonwealth of Massachusetts (1781)
- State of Rhode Island and Providence Plantations → State of Rhode Island (2020)

=== Cities and towns ===
- Amadora, Portugal, was known as Porcalhota until 1907. The name change was due to the unflattering meaning of the original toponym (something like "Little dirty one").
- Astana, Kazakhstan – renamed Nur-Sultan from 2019 to 2022. Kazakhstan's legislature passed a law on 20 March 2019 to rename the Central Asian nation's capital city from Astana to Nur-Sultan. The act came one day after Nursultan Nazarbayev's resignation as president of the country.
- Attock, Pakistan, was known as Campbellpur.
- Atyrau, Kazakhstan, formerly from 1708 to 1992 as Guriev (or Gur'yev, Gurjev, or Guryev)
- Banda Aceh, Indonesia – formerly known as Kutaraja.
- Bangalore, India, set to be changed to Bengaluru with state government approval in 2006 but yet to be ratified by the central government
- Banjul, formerly Bathurst.
- Beijing, China, usually spelled Peking until the 1980s. Named Peiping (Beiping in Pinyin) from 1927 to 1949.
- Bengkulu, Indonesia – formerly known as Bencoolen.
- Bin Qasim, Pakistan – formerly known as Pipri.
- Bishkek, Kyrgyzstan, between 1926 and 1991 called Frunze.
- Bogor, Indonesia – formerly known as Buitenzorg.
- Bogotá – Changed to Santa Fé de Bogotá D.C. (Distrito Capital) in 1991 from Bogotá D.E. (Distrito Especial). Changed back to the simplified Bogotá D.C. (Distrito Capital) in 2000.
- Bratislava, Slovakia, formerly Pozsony or Pressburg
- Busan – spelt Pusan prior to the official adoption of the Revised Romanization by the South Korean Government in 2000. During the Korean War it was the temporary capital. Named Dongrae (동래/東萊) until 1910. In 1920, renamed Busan.
- Châlons-en-Champagne, formerly Châlons-sur-Marne until 1998.
- Charleroi, Belgium, formerly known as Charnoy until 1666.
- Chemnitz, Germany – from 1953 to 1990 named Karl-Marx-Stadt after Karl Marx.
- Chennai, called Madras until 1996.
- Ciudad Altamirano, Mexico. Formerly known as Pungarabato until 1936.
- Ciudad Bolívar, Venezuela. Formerly Santo Tomás de la Nueva Guayana de la Angostura del Orinoco (briefed as just Angostura) until 1846.
- Ciudad del Este, Paraguay. Founded as Puerto Flor de Lis in 1957, later renamed as Puerto Presidente Stroessner. Received its current name after his fall in 1989.
- Ciudad Guerrero, Mexico. Formerly known as Concepción de Papigochi until 1859.
- Ciudad Guzmán, Mexico. Formerly Zapotlán el Grande until 1856.
- Ciudad Hidalgo, Mexico. Formerly known as Taximaroa until 1908, and Villa Hidalgo until 1922.
- Ciudad Juárez, Mexico. Formerly known as (El) Paso del Norte until 1888. El Paso, Texas, which was formerly one larger city including what is now Ciudad Juárez before the United States' annexation of Texas from Mexico, still carries a shortened version of the old name with the Spanish definite article El permanently attached to the English name.
- Ciudad Lerdo, Mexico. Formerly known as San Fernando until 1864.
- Ciudad Victoria, Mexico. Formerly known as Santa María de Aguayo until 1863.
- Cobh, Ireland – formerly known as Queenstown
- Constância, Portugal was known as Punhete until 1833. The name change was justified by the resemblance of the old toponym with the word punheta (Portuguese for "hand job").
- Dhaka, Bangladesh – previously Dacca
- Daegu – spelt Taegu prior to the official adoption of the Revised Romanization by the South Korean Government in 2000. In ancient times, Dalgubeol (달구벌/達句伐)
- Dnipro, Ukraine, was officially changed from Dnipropetrovsk in 2016, following Ukraine's decommunization laws (the former name is a contraction of the Ukrainian name of the river Dnieper and the surname of Soviet leader Hryhoriy Petrovsky). Previous names include Katerynoslav, Sicheslav, and Novorossiysk.
- Dobrich – known as Bazargic between 1913 and 1940, Tolbuhin between 1945 and 1990. It was known Hacıoğlu Pazarcık during Ottoman rule
- Donetsk – founded as Yuzovka (after John Hughes) in 1870, called Stalino 1924-–1961, renamed Donyetsk in Russian (Donetsk in Ukrainian) after the De-Stalinization period in the USSR
- Dushanbe – known as Stalinabad between 1929–1961 and renamed Dushanbe after the De-Stalinization period in the Soviet Union.
- Dún Laoghaire, Ireland – formerly known as Kingstown
- Eisenhüttenstadt, Germany, was founded as Stalinstadt after World War II to settle displaced people from the former eastern German territories, and was renamed during the De-Stalinization period in the Soviet Union.
- Faisalabad was known as Lyallpur (until the 1970s) in Pakistan.
- Flores, Guatemala. Formerly known as Santa María de los Remedios until 1831.
- Florianópolis was known as Desterro until 1893, when the president of recent-founded Brazilian republic, Marshal Floriano Peixoto, crushed the Naval Revolts, and the supporters of Peixoto, after the imprisonment of all his opponents, changed the name of the city to honor the Marshal.
- Fugging – two places in Austria were called Fucking.
- Gagarin, town in Russia; formerly Gzhatsk, took current name after cosmonaut Yuri Gagarin's death in 1968
- Gdańsk – in German Danzig, when part of Kingdom of Prussia or Germany (1793–1920 and 1940–5) and as a Free City (1920–39).
- Gustavo A. Madero, Mexico. Formerly known successively as Tepeyac, Villa de Guadalupe and Guadalupe Hidalgo. Got its current name in 1931.
- Harare – named Salisbury until 1982. Other place names in Zimbabwe also changed.
- Heraklion in Crete, Greece: Its ancient name was Heraklion. In 824 it was named "Handaq" (The Moat) from which derived the Greek name "Chandax" in Byzantine times (961–1204) and later the Italian "Candia" during the Venetian period (1212–1669) when Candia eventually became the name of the whole island of Crete. In Turkish times (1669–1898) it was called "Kandiye" by the Ottomans but from the locals "Megalo Kastro" (Great Castle) or simply "Kastro". During the time of the autonomous Cretan State (1898–1913) scholars proposed to reuse the ancient name "Heraklion" which eventually was accepted by the locals.
- Hermosillo, Mexico. Known as Villa del Pitic until 1828.
- Ho Chi Minh City – formerly Saigon, changed in 1975 after the fall of South Vietnam (see also Names of Ho Chi Minh City)
- Huambo, formerly Nova Lisboa, changed in 1975 after the independence of Angola
- Istanbul – since 28 March 1930, formerly Byzantium (under Greek rule) then Constantinople (under Roman and Ottoman rule); the latter name change inspired the popular song "Istanbul (Not Constantinople)" (see also Names of Istanbul)
- Iqaluit, capital of Nunavut Territory in Canada, known as Frobisher Bay until 1987.
- Ivano-Frankivsk, founded as Polish Stanisławów in 1662, changed to Stanislau in 1772, under Austria. After World War I it returned to its original name. Then it was known as Stalislav (1939–41), Stanislau (1941–45) and again Stanislav, until 1962, when it has been renamed to its current name, to honour Ivan Franko.
- İzmir – since 28 March 1930, formerly Smyrna (under Roman and Ottoman rule).
- Jakarta, Indonesia – formerly Batavia, Jayakarta, and Sunda Kelapa.
- Jayapura, Indonesia – formerly known as Hollandia and Sukarnopura.
- Jerusalem – renamed Aelia Capitolina by the Romans in 135 and was restored to Jerusalem in 325.
- João Pessoa – formerly known as Cidade da Parahyba, as Frederikstad and as Filipéia de Nossa Senhora das Neves.
- Kabwe in Zambia – formerly Broken Hill.
- Kaliningrad from Königsberg in 1946 (along with other cities in East Prussia)
- Kanpur, India – formerly known as Cawnpore.
- Katowice in Silesia, Poland was Stalinogród between 1953 and 1956, and Kattowitz when under German rule
- Kenora, Ontario, Canada from Rat Portage in 1905.
- Khujand, Tajikistan from Leninabad between 1939 and 1992. Khodjend before 1939.
- Kimchaek, North Korea, formerly known as Songjin. Renamed during the Korean War after the chief of staff of the North Korean army killed during the war.
- Kingisepp, Russia, named after an Estonian communist Viktor Kingissepp, formerly named Yamburg, Yam, and Yama (Yamsky Gorodok).
- Kinshasa – formerly Léopoldville, changed in 1966.
- Kirov, Russia – formerly Vyatka
- Kitchener, Ontario was known as Berlin until 1916; it was changed due to hostility toward Germany in World War I. (See Berlin to Kitchener name change)
- Kisangani, formerly Stanleyville
- Klaipėda from Memel in 1945
- Kochi, India – formerly Cochin.
- Kota Kinabalu from Jesselton.
- Kolkata, India – formerly Calcutta.
- Kollam, India – formerly Quilon.
- Krasnodar – formerly Yekaterinodar.
- Kuito formerly Silva Porto, changed in 1975 after the independence of Angola
- Kuressaare, Estonia – was named Kingissepa after an Estonian communist Viktor Kingissepp during the Soviet occupation, but was renamed Kuressaare again in 1988.
- Kuujjuaq, Quebec, known as Fort Chimo until 1980.
- Lake Station, Indiana, from East Gary, to disassociate itself from the adjacent city of Gary.
- Libres, Mexico. Formerly known as San Juan de los Llanos until 1860.
- Liège, Belgium, formerly known as Liége until 1946.
- Londonderry, Northern Ireland – known as Derry until 1623 when it received a royal charter. The previous name still remains in use in certain areas. (See Derry/Londonderry name dispute)
- Lubumbashi, formerly Élisabethville.
- Lüshun – formerly Port Arthur in English, or Ryojun during the Japanese occupation in the 1930s and 1940s.
- Lviv, Ukraine – originally called Lviv. It was the capital of the Kingdom of Ruthenia from 1272 until 1349, when it was conquered by Polish Kingdom and became Lwów. Then became Lemberg under Austro-Hungarian rule (1772–1918), reverted to Lviv for a short time of existence of West Ukrainian Republic (1918), reverted to Lwów (1918–1945), then Lvov under Soviet rule (1945–1991); restored current name on Ukrainian independence
- Latina – (Italy, Latium), whose former original fascist name was Littoria.
- Makassar, Indonesia – formerly known as Ujung Pandang.
- Malabo – formerly Santa Isabel.
- Maputo – formerly Lourenço Marques.
- Marijampolė, Lithuania – was named Kapsukas after a Lithuanian communist Vincas Mickevičius-Kapsukas during the Soviet occupation, but was renamed Marijampolė again in 1991.
- Matamoros, Mexico. Founded as San Juan de los Esteros in 1774, renamed Nuestra Señora del Refugio de los Esteros (shortened to Villa del Refugio) in 1793. Received its current name in 1826.
- Mbala, Zambia – formerly Abercorn
- Mexico City – formerly the two altepetls (or polities) of Mexihco-Tlatelolco and Mexihco-Tenochtitlan.
- Montana, Bulgaria – known as Kutlovitsa until 1890, Ferdinand between 1890 and 1945, Mihaylovgrad between 1945 and 1993.
- Montemorelos, Mexico. Formerly known as San Mateo del Pilón until 1825.
- Morelia, Mexico. Formerly known as Valladolid de Michoacán until 1827.
- Mumbai, India – formerly known as Bombay.
- Natal; known as New Amsterdam between 1633 and 1654 during the Dutch occupation.
- New York – formerly New Amsterdam (see History of New York City)
- Nizhniy Novgorod was Gorkiy during the Soviet Union from 1932 to 1990.
- North Little Rock, Arkansas – formerly Argenta until 1917
- Novohrad-Volynskyi known to 1796 as Zwiahel, or Zvyahel.
- Nuuk renamed from Godthåb in 1979, following the introduction of the Home Rule.
- Orenburg was renamed Chkalov from 1938 to 1957, after Valery Chkalov and renamed Orenburg in 1957.
- Oslo, Norway renamed Christiania when rebuilt after fire in 1624. Spelled Kristiania between 1877 and 1925 when the name returned to Oslo.
- Ottawa, Ontario known as Bytown until 1855.
- Parramatta, Australia was known as Rose Hill from establishment in 1788 until 1791.
- Perm, known as Molotov from 1945 to 1957, after Vyacheslav Molotov and renamed Perm in 1957.
- Podgorica, known as Titograd 1945–1992
- Polokwane, changed from Pietersburg in 2003, along with some other towns
- Port Klang, changed from Port Swettenham, the port of Kuala Lumpur, Malaysia
- Portlaoise, Ireland – formerly Maryborough.
- Prayagraj, India; formerly Allahabad
- Priozersk, Russia – in Finnish Käkisalmi, when part of Finland, until 1944.
- Puebla de Zaragoza, Mexico, known as Puebla de los Ángeles until 1862.
- Recife, Brazil – formerly Mauritsstad.
- Regina, Saskatchewan, Canada from Pile O' Bones or Pile-of-bones in 1882 in what was then the North-West Territory.
- Rijeka from Fiume in 1945
- Royal Tunbridge Wells, changed from Queen's-Wells to Tunbridge Wells in 1797. Renamed in 1909 to its current name after receiving a royal charter.
- Royal Wootton Bassett – known as Wootton Bassett until 2011 when it received a royal charter.
- Sahiwal – formerly known as Montgomery in Pakistan.
- Saint Petersburg – originally Saint Petersburg (in 1703), then Petrograd (in 1914), Leningrad (in 1924) and back to Saint Petersburg in 1991
- Saltcoats, Saskatchewan, Canada from Stirling in what was then the North-West Territories.
- Samara, Russia – renamed Kuibyshev from 1935 to 1991, after Valerian Kuibyshev and renamed Samara in 1991.
- San Cristóbal de las Casas, Mexico, formerly known as Ciudad Real de Chiapa or Chiapa de Españoles until the end of Spanish rule.
- San Felipe Torres Mochas, recovered its original name in 1948; from 1889 until that year it was known as Villa Hernández Álvarez.
- San Pablo del Monte, Mexico. The original name before 1940, became known as Villa Vicente Guerrero until 2016.
- Santo Domingo, capital of the Dominican Republic was renamed Ciudad Trujillo between 1936 and 1961 in a drive of personality cult around the dictator Rafael Leónidas Trujillo that also affected Pico Duarte (renamed Pico Trujillo), several provinces, and other Dominican features.
- Seoul – formerly Hanyang (from 1392), then Hanseong (from 1395), Keijō or Gyeongseong (from 1914) and renamed Seoul in 1946. (See also Names of Seoul)
- Sasmuan – formerly Sexmoán, renamed in 1991 after a referendum due to perceived sexual connotations of its former name.
- Shenyang – formerly Mukden, Fengtian (奉天) or Shengjing (盛京).
- Staines-upon-Thames formerly Staines, renamed in 2012 with the aim of promoting its riverside location, boosting the local economy and to disassociate itself from the character Ali G.
- Sucre formerly known as La Plata (1539-mid 17th century), Charcas (mid 17th century to early 18th century) and Chuquisaca (until 1831), current name in honour of Antonio José de Sucre.
- Szczecin – in German Stettin, when part of Germany, until 1945.
- Tallinn – known as Reval until 1917.
- Tel Aviv-Yafo – renamed Tel Aviv from Ahuzat Bayit. Renamed Tel Aviv-Yafo in 1950 after the annexation of Jaffa (Yafo).
- Thiruvananthapuram, India – formerly Trivandrum.
- Thunder Bay, Ontario, Canada in 1970 from the merger of twin cities of Fort William and Port Arthur.
- Tokyo – formerly Edo, until it became the capital of Japan in 1868.
- Tolyatti – formerly known as Stavropol-on-Volga and Stavropol. In 1964, it was renamed Tolyatti after Palmiro Togliatti
- Toronto – known as York at the time of the War of 1812.
- Toulon – renamed briefly as Port-la-Montagne after the siege of Toulon (1793) by the Montagne faction of the French Convention
- Tskhinvali, Georgia – also known as Tskhinval or Ch'reba in present time, formerly named Staliniri (1934–1961)
- Tver – known as Kalinin from 1931 to 1990.
- Ulyanovsk in Russia, formerly Simbirsk
- Ürümqi – formerly known as Tihwa (迪化; Dǐhuà in pinyin), which means "to enlighten" in Chinese. In 1954, renamed Ürümqi, which means "beautiful pasture" in Dzungar Mongolian.
- Val-des-Sources, Quebec, known as Asbestos until 2020.
- Varanasi, India – formerly known as Benares (or Banaras) and Kashi.
- Veles, known as Titov Veles between 1945 and 1991.
- Ventura, California, originally San Buenaventura, New Spain and Mexico.
- Vilnius – the capital of Lithuania was known as Vilna or Wilno when it was under Polish rule (1920–1939).
- Villahermosa, Mexico. Formerly known as San Juan Bautista until 1916.
- Virden, Manitoba, Canada from Manchester.
- Volgograd – formerly Tsaritsyn (1589–1925), Stalingrad (1925–1961).
- Vyborg – in Finnish Viipuri, when part of Finland, until 1944.
- Wanganui, New Zealand. Originally called Petre, now known dually as Wanganui and Whanganui.
- Wrocław – in German Breslau, when part of Germany, until 1945.
- Xi'an – Usually spelt Sian until the 1980s. Formerly Chang'an (長安), the ancient name for the city when it was the capital of China until the name was changed to Xi'an in the Ming dynasty.
- Xiangyang, named Xiangfan between 1950 and 2010.
- Yangon – renamed Yangon after being known as Rangoon (1852–1988). Still known as Rangoon in many English-speaking countries.
- Yekaterinburg – known as Sverdlovsk in the Soviet Union.
- Yonashiro – changed from Okinawan "Yonagusuku" to a Japanese name and elevated to town status in 1994.
- Yuzhno-Sakhalinsk – named Toyohara under Japanese rule between 1905 and 1946, but before that was Vladimirovka, a Russian settlement before the Russo-Japanese War (1882–1905).
- Zhob, Pakistan – renamed from Fort Sandeman in 1976.
- Zlín, Czech Republic – renamed Gottwaldov between 1949 and 1989 after Klement Gottwald, a Czechoslovak communist politician, before reverting to Zlín.
- Zmiiv, Ukraine – renamed Gotwald between 1976 and 1990 after Klement Gottwald, a Czechoslovak communist politician, before reverting to Zmiiv.

== Unusual name changes ==
- Speed, Victoria, was renamed Speedkills for one month in 2011 as a road safety campaign.
- Truth or Consequences, New Mexico, changed from the name "Hot Springs" in 1950 when Truth or Consequences host Ralph Edwards announced that he would do the show from the first town that renamed itself after the popular radio program.
- Jim Thorpe, Pennsylvania, formerly Mauch Chunk and East Mauch Chunk, negotiated a deal with the heirs of athlete Jim Thorpe to become the site of his tomb in a bid to increase tourism.
- Ismay, Montana, unofficially took the name of "Joe, Montana", after the NFL quarterback Joe Montana, as part of a 1993 publicity stunt
- Clark, Texas, renamed itself "DISH" after the EchoStar Communications' Dish Network – all 55 households in the town are given free satellite television for 10 years
- Buffalo, Texas, temporarily renamed itself "Blue Star, Texas" in 1993 and 1994 when the Dallas Cowboys faced the Buffalo Bills in the Super Bowl, and later renamed itself "Green Star, Texas" in 1999 when the Dallas Stars faced the Buffalo Sabres in the Stanley Cup Final (Buffalo is approximately 100 miles (160 km) southeast of Dallas; in all three instances the supportive name change proved successful for the Dallas-area team)
- Halfway, Oregon, became the first place to accept money from a dot-com to change its name to match the web site "Half.com"
- Santa, Idaho, a hamlet with a population of 115 became "secretsanta.com" on 9 December 2005
- Pippa Passes, Kentucky, originally Caney Creek but renamed after the Robert Browning poem Pippa Passes through the influence of Alice Spencer Geddes Lloyd, founder of Alice Lloyd College.
- Washington, Pennsylvania, temporarily renamed itself "Steeler" when the Pittsburgh Steelers made it to the Super Bowl in 2006.
- Eastpointe, Michigan, incorporated as the village of Halfway in December 1924 and reincorporated as the City of East Detroit in January 1929. The city changed its name to "Eastpointe" after a vote in 1992; the name change had been proposed to reduce its association with the adjacent city of Detroit (a move that offended many Detroit residents), and the "-pointe" is intended to associate the city with the exclusive communities of the Grosse Pointes. However, the school district that serves most of the city was unaffected by the municipal name change for many years afterwards, and consequently still used the name East Detroit Public Schools up until 2017, before changing to Eastpointe Community Schools.
- Sleepy Hollow, New York, renamed from North Tarrytown in 1997 in honor of the Washington Irving short story.
- On June 4–9 of each year, Dublin, Texas changes its name (and even its road signs) to Dr Pepper, Texas, to commemorate the anniversary of the first Dr Pepper Bottling Plant, which is located there.
- The Chilean Robinson Crusoe Island, renamed from "Más a Tierra" in 1966.
- The Spanish village Asquerosa (in Spanish, 'filthy') was renamed as Valderrubio in 1943.
- Richland, New Jersey briefly renamed itself "Mohito" in 2004 at the behest of the Bacardi company in honor of the mint grown at Delponte Farms, an essential ingredient in the drink.
- The New Zealand town of Otorohanga briefly changed its name to "Harrodsville" in 1986, in support of local restaurateur Henry Harrod, who was being threatened with lawsuits over the name of his business by Harrods of London.
- Two neighbors of Paterson, New Jersey were renamed to reduce its association with the adjacent city. In 1973, the Borough of East Paterson was renamed Elmwood Park, New Jersey, and in 2009, the Borough of West Paterson was renamed Woodland Park, New Jersey. Both boroughs elected to retain its original initials.
- In 1793, the troops of the French Convention crushed a revolt in Marseille, France. As a punishment, the Convention renamed it as Ville-sans-nom ("Nameless city").

== See also ==
- Africanization
- Animal name changes in Turkey
- Damnatio memoriae – Exclusion of a person from official records and accounts
- Decoloniality
- Dual naming
- Endonym and exonym
- Hebraization of Palestinian place names
- Indigenization
- Geographic Names Information System
- List of administrative division name changes
- List of city name changes
- List of Australian place names changed from German names
- List of renamed places in Angola
- List of renamed cities and towns in Russia
- List of renamed places in the United States
- List of double placenames
- List of entities and changes in The World Factbook
- List of places
- List of politically motivated renamings
- South African Geographical Names Council
- Street name controversy
- Street sign theft
- Toponymy
- United Nations Conference on the Standardization of Geographical Names
- United States Board on Geographic Names

== Bibliography ==
- Branford, Becky (26 May 2005). "City names mark changing times" at BBC News. Accessed 26 November 2005.
- Giraut F. & Houssay-Holzschuch M., 2022,The Politics of Place Naming: Naming the World, ISTE/John Wiley.
