= List of renamed cities in Latvia =

The following is the list of cities in Latvia that underwent a name change in the past.

- Stučka → Aizkraukle
- Dünaburg → Borisoglebsk → (1656) → Dünaburg (1667) → Dvinsk (1893) → Daugavpils (1920)
- Libau → Libava → Liepāja (1917)
- Birži → Madona (1920)
- Windau → Ventspils (parallel use until the 1920s)
- Wenden → Cēsis (parallel use until the 1920s)
- Schrunden → Skrunda (parallel use until the 1920s)
- Stukmaņi → Pļaviņas (parallel use until the 1920s)
- Sasmaka → Valdemārpils (1926)
- Haynasch → Ainaži (1917)
- Marienburg → Alūksne (~1750)
- Vecauce → Auce (1924)
- Mitau → Mītava → Jelgava (~1860)
- Wolmar → Valmiera (parallel use until the 1920s)
- Jakobstadt → Jēkabpils (parallel use until the 1920s)
- Goldingen → Kuldīga (parallel use until the 1920s)
- Neibāde → Saulkrasti (until 1931)
- Lemesele → Lemsal → Limbaži (until 1931)

== See also ==
- List of cities and towns in East Prussia
- List of renamed cities in Estonia
- List of renamed cities in Lithuania
