= List of former Edinburgh street names =

Below are lists of former street names in Edinburgh, Scotland, United Kingdom. This is a compilation of lost, renamed or relocated streets in Edinburgh. The degree of preservation of the city, in combination with its status as the home of many famous persons, renders the list worthwhile. The many narrow closes lost and gained over the centuries are excluded.

== Demolished ==
In most cities, this list would be too huge to contemplate. Given Edinburgh's restricted redevelopment in relation to other cities, the list is manageable (only including redevelopment which included loss of full streets).

- Argyll Square - demolished to create Royal Museum, Chambers Street
- Arthur Street - demolished in the early 60s. Was once the steepest street in Edinburgh
- Brown Square - demolished for George IV Bridge, Chambers Street and Museum of Scotland
- Canal Street - demolished to create Waverley Station
- Cannon Street - demolished to create Leith Fort development in 1950s
- Craigside Place - demolished to build Dumbiedykes
- Gilmore Street - demolished for extension to Waverley Station
- Helen Place - demolished to create Leith Fort development in 1950s
- Leith Wynd - north end demolished to create Waverley Station south end demolished to form Jeffrey St
- London Row - demolished to create Leith Fort development in 1960s
- Luckenbooths - demolished to allow free access around St Giles Cathedral
- McDowall Street - demolished for extension to Waverley Station
- Park Place - demolished to build the university's medical school on Bristo Street
- Salisbury Square, Salisbury Street - demolished same time as Arthur Street
- Shakespeare Square - demolished to create GPO/Waterloo Place
- Swinton Row - demolished to create the St James Centre
- Victoria Place, Newhaven - demolished as part of the redevelopment of Newhaven.

== Renamed ==
Absorption of outer towns such as Leith and Portobello in the 1920s necessitated a renaming of several streets due to duplication. Duplicates are marked (D). Individual building projects which were given unique names were often renamed for simplicity when lying on major arterial roads such as Leith Walk or Morningside Road. Some renamings are adjustments rather than full renaming.

- Albany Street, Leith - now Portland Street (D)
- Archibald Place, Leith - now West Bowling Green Street (D)
- Bank Place, Leith - now part of Ferry Road
- Bath Street, Leith - now Salamander Place (D)
- Braid Place, Sciennes - now Sciennes House Place
- Bridge Street, Leith - now Sandport Place
- Canary Side - now part of Buccleuch Street
- Cassels Place - now addressed as part of Leith Walk.
- Castle Barns - now part of Morrison Street
- Catherine Street - now Leith Street
- Charlotte Street, Leith - now Queen Charlotte Street (D)
- Church Lane - now Newbattle Terrace (D)
- Dove Loan - merged with Albert Terrace
- Duncan Street - now Dundonald Street (D)
- Duke Street - added to Dublin Street (D)
- Eldin Street - now Adam Street
- Fife Place - now part of Leith Walk
- George Place - now part of Leith Walk
- George Street, Leith - now part of North Fort Street (N)
- Graham Street (off Lauriston Place) - renamed as an extension of Keir Street in 1922
- Greenhill Bank - now part of Morningside Road
- Hope Street, Leith - now Casselbank Street (D)
- Jamaica Street, Leith - now part of Ferry Road (D)
- James Street (originally St James Street) - now Spey Terrace
- John Place, Leith - now Johns Place
- Kings Place - now part of Leith Walk
- Kings Stables - now Kings Stables Road
- Lady Lawsons Wynd - now Lady Lawson Street
- Lower Calton - now Calton Road
- McNeill Place - now part of Leith Walk
- Maitland Street, Newhaven - now part of Newhaven Main Street (D)
- Marmion Terrace - now part of Morningside Road
- Merchiston Bank - now part of Tipperlinn Road
- Moray Street - now Spey Street (to avoid confusion with Moray Place)
- Morningside Bank - now part of Morningside Road
- Morton Street, Leith - now Academy Street
- Niddrie Road - now Duddingston Park South
- North Back of Canongate - now Calton Road
- Nottingham Place/Terrace - now Greenside Row
- Orchardfield Street, Tollcross - now part of Bread Street
- Pilrig Place - now part of Leith Walk (one small section still retains the original name)
- Pitt Street - added to Dundas Street (D)
- Portland Place, Tollcross - now Lauriston Place (D)
- Queen's Crescent, Blackhall - now Queen's Avenue South (D)
- Queens Place, Leith - now part of Leith Walk
- Queen Street, Leith - now Shore Place (D)
- Regent Street - now Prince Regent Street to avoid confusion with Regent Road
- Register Street - now James Craig Walk
- Rosslyn Street - now Rosslyn Crescent
- Southfield Avenue, Drum Brae - now Barntongate Avenue
- Southfield Drive, Drum Brae - now Barntongate Drive
- Southfield Terrace, Drum Brae - now Barntongate Terrace (D)
- St Bernard St - now Bernard Street
- St Giles Street, Leith -now Giles Street (D)
- St Ninians Lane - now Quayside Street (D)
- South Back of Canongate - now Holyrood Road
- Thomsons Place, Leith - now part of Duke Street
- Tobago Street - now part of Morrison Street
- Union Street, Leith - now Kirk Street (D)
- Water Gate - now part of the Canongate
- Water Lane - now Water Street
- Waverley Terrace - now part of Morningside Road
- Wellington Street, Leith - now Dudley Avenue South
- Wharton Place - now part of Lauriston Place
- Wilton Terrace - now part of Tipperlinn Road

== Relocated ==
The City of Edinburgh Council sometimes revitalises old street names, rather than finding a new name (and this is often the preference). However, these new streets are often not in the exact location as originally found, which can be very confusing to genealogists.

- Orchardfield - formerly a terrace on Leith Walk, now a modern estate behind its former location
- Teviot Row - this name used to link to the area now known as Bristo Street - the name has jumped southwards to the south side of McEwan Hall
- Riego Street - this historic name was reused considerably to the east of its former location
- Steads Place - originally a section on Leith Walk, now a side street off Leith Walk
