= List of renamed places in Angola =

This is a list of renamed places in Angola.

== Country ==
Prior to independence in 1975, Angola was known as Portuguese Angola, or occasionally Portuguese West Africa. Upon independence, the country was renamed the Republic of Angola.

== Cities and towns ==
- Teixeira da Silva → Bailundo (1975)
- Benguella → Benguela (1975)
- Vila Robert Williams → Caála (1975)
- Concelho → Caconda (1975)
- Amboim → Cabela → Gabela
- Huambo → Nova Lisboa (1928) → Huambo (1975)
- Silva Porto → Kuito (1975)
- Loanda → Luanda (1975)
- Teixeira de Sousa → Luau (1975)
- Sá da Bandeira → Lubango
- Vila Luso → Luena (1975)
- São Salvador → M'banza-Kongo (1975)
- Serpa Pinto → Menongue (1975)
- Moçâmedes → Namibe (1985) → Moçâmedes (2016)
- Vila Salazar → N'dalatando (1975)
- Kissonde → Benguela → Benguela Velha → Porto Amboim (1923)
- Henrique de Carvalho → Saurimo (1975)
- Santo António do Zaire → Soyo (1975)
- Novo Redondo → Sumbe (1975)
- Porto Alexandre → Tômbwa (1975)
- Uíge → Vila Marechal de Carmona (1955) → Carmona → Uíge (1975)
- Santa Comba → Waku-Kungo (1975)

=== Proposed ===
- Porto Amboim → Gunza/Porto Gabela
- Cabinda → Tchiowa

== Other places ==
- University of General Studies of Angola → University of Luanda (1968) → Agostinho Neto University (1985)

== See also ==
- Lists of renamed places
