= List of entities and changes in The World Factbook =

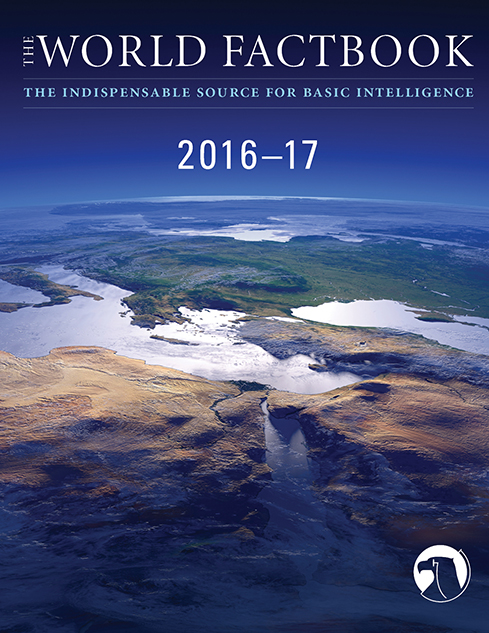
Cover of The World Factbook

This is a list of entities and changes in The World Factbook. The World Factbook was an annual publication of the Central Intelligence Agency of the United States with almanac-style information about the countries of the world.

At the time of its discontinuation in February 2026, The World Factbook consisted of 258 entities. These entities can be divided into categories. These categories are:

- Independent countries
- Others
- Dependencies and Areas of Special Sovereignty
- Miscellaneous
- Other entities

After the list of entities, there is a table that lists entities that have been dropped, added, renamed, or consolidated in The World Factbook.

== List of entities ==
The list of entities follows below. The names and flags of entities are as listed in the Factbook and may differ from other sources.

=== Independent countries ===
This is a list of independent countries. The CIA defines an independent country as people "politically organized into a sovereign state with a definite territory". In this category, there are 195 entities:

Flag of entity	Name of entity	Flag of entity	Name of entity	Flag of entity	Name of entity	Flag of entity	Name of entity
Afghanistan	Afghanistan	Albania	Albania	Algeria	Algeria	Andorra	Andorra
Angola	Angola	Antigua and Barbuda	Antigua and Barbuda	Argentina	Argentina	Armenia	Armenia
Australia	Australia	Austria	Austria	Azerbaijan	Azerbaijan	The Bahamas	The Bahamas
Bahrain	Bahrain	Bangladesh	Bangladesh	Barbados	Barbados	Belarus	Belarus
Belgium	Belgium	Belize	Belize	Benin	Benin	Bhutan	Bhutan
Bolivia	Bolivia	Bosnia and Herzegovina	Bosnia and Herzegovina	Botswana	Botswana	Brazil	Brazil
Brunei	Brunei	Bulgaria	Bulgaria	Burkina Faso	Burkina Faso	Burundi	Burundi
Cambodia	Cambodia	Cameroon	Cameroon	Canada	Canada	Cape Verde	Cape Verde
Central African Republic	Central African; Republic	Chad	Chad	Chile	Chile	China	China
Colombia	Colombia	Comoros	Comoros	Costa Rica	Costa Rica	Croatia	Croatia
Cuba	Cuba	Cyprus	Cyprus	Czech Republic	Czech Republic	Democratic Republic of the Congo	Democratic Republic of the Congo
Denmark	Denmark	Djibouti	Djibouti	Dominica	Dominica	Dominican Republic	Dominican; Republic
Ecuador	Ecuador	Egypt	Egypt	El Salvador	El Salvador	Equatorial Guinea	Equatorial Guinea
Eritrea	Eritrea	Estonia	Estonia	Eswatini	Eswatini	Ethiopia	Ethiopia
Fiji	Fiji	Finland	Finland	France	France	Gabon	Gabon
The Gambia	The Gambia	Georgia (country)	Georgia	Germany	Germany	Ghana	Ghana
Greece	Greece	Grenada	Grenada	Guatemala	Guatemala	Guinea	Guinea
Guinea-Bissau	Guinea-Bissau	Guyana	Guyana	Haiti	Haiti	Honduras	Honduras
Hungary	Hungary	Iceland	Iceland	India	India	Indonesia	Indonesia
Iran	Iran	Iraq	Iraq	Republic of Ireland	Ireland	Israel	Israel
Italy	Italy	Ivory Coast	Ivory Coast	Jamaica	Jamaica	Japan	Japan
Jordan	Jordan	Kazakhstan	Kazakhstan	Kenya	Kenya	Kiribati	Kiribati
Kosovo	Kosovo	Kuwait	Kuwait	Kyrgyzstan	Kyrgyzstan	Laos	Laos
Latvia	Latvia	Lebanon	Lebanon	Lesotho	Lesotho	Liberia	Liberia
Libya	Libya	Liechtenstein	Liechtenstein	Lithuania	Lithuania	Luxembourg	Luxembourg
Madagascar	Madagascar	Malawi	Malawi	Malaysia	Malaysia	Maldives	Maldives
Mali	Mali	Malta	Malta	Marshall Islands	Marshall Islands	Mauritania	Mauritania
Mauritius	Mauritius	Mexico	Mexico	Federated States of Micronesia	Micronesia	Moldova	Moldova
Monaco	Monaco	Mongolia	Mongolia	Montenegro	Montenegro	Morocco	Morocco
Mozambique	Mozambique	Myanmar	Myanmar	Namibia	Namibia	Nauru	Nauru
Nepal	Nepal	Netherlands	Netherlands	New Zealand	New Zealand	Nicaragua	Nicaragua
Niger	Niger	Nigeria	Nigeria	North Korea	North Korea	North Macedonia	North Macedonia
Norway	Norway	Oman	Oman	Pakistan	Pakistan	Palau	Palau
Panama	Panama	Papua New Guinea	Papua New; Guinea	Paraguay	Paraguay	Peru	Peru
Philippines	Philippines						
Poland	Poland	Portugal	Portugal	Qatar	Qatar	Republic of the Congo	Republic of the Congo
Romania	Romania	Russia	Russia	Rwanda	Rwanda	Saint Kitts and Nevis	Saint Kitts and Nevis
Saint Lucia	Saint Lucia	Saint Vincent and the Grenadines	Saint Vincent and the Grenadines	Samoa	Samoa	San Marino	San Marino
São Tomé and Príncipe	Sao Tome and Principe	Saudi Arabia	Saudi Arabia	Senegal	Senegal	Serbia	Serbia
Seychelles	Seychelles	Sierra Leone	Sierra Leone	Singapore	Singapore	Slovakia	Slovakia
Slovenia	Slovenia	Solomon Islands	Solomon Islands	Somalia	Somalia	South Africa	South Africa
South Korea	South Korea	South Sudan	South Sudan	Spain	Spain	Sri Lanka	Sri Lanka
Sudan	Sudan	Suriname	Suriname	Sweden	Sweden	Switzerland	Switzerland
Syria	Syria	Tajikistan	Tajikistan	Tanzania	Tanzania	Thailand	Thailand
Timor-Leste	Timor-Leste	Togo	Togo	Tonga	Tonga	Trinidad and Tobago	Trinidad and Tobago
Tunisia	Tunisia	Turkey	Turkey	Turkmenistan	Turkmenistan	Tuvalu	Tuvalu
Uganda	Uganda	Ukraine	Ukraine	United Arab Emirates	United; Arab Emirates	United Kingdom	United Kingdom
United States	United States	Uruguay	Uruguay	Uzbekistan	Uzbekistan		
Vanuatu	Vanuatu	Vatican City	Vatican City	Venezuela	Venezuela	Vietnam	Vietnam
Yemen	Yemen	Zambia	Zambia	Zimbabwe	Zimbabwe		

=== Others ===
This is a list of other places set apart from the list of independent countries. There are two entities in this category:

Flag of entity	Name of entity
European Union	European Union
Taiwan	Taiwan

=== Dependencies and Areas of Special Sovereignty ===
This category is a list of places affiliated with another country. They may be subdivided into categories using the country they are affiliated with:

Flag of entity	Name of entity
Australia: six entities
Australia	Ashmore and Cartier Islands
Australia	Cocos (Keeling) Islands
Australia	Coral Sea Islands
Australia	Heard Island and McDonald Islands
Christmas Island	Christmas Island
Norfolk Island	Norfolk Island
China: two entities
Hong Kong	Hong Kong
Macau	Macau
Denmark: two entities
Faroe Islands	Faroe Islands
Greenland	Greenland
France: eight entities
France	Clipperton Island
France	French Southern and Antarctic Lands
France	New Caledonia
France	Saint Barthelemy
France	Saint Martin
French Polynesia	French Polynesia
Saint Pierre and Miquelon	Saint Pierre and Miquelon
Wallis and Futuna	Wallis and Futuna
Netherlands: three entities
Aruba	Aruba
Curaçao	Curacao
Sint Maarten	Sint Maarten
New Zealand: three entities
Cook Islands	Cook Islands
Niue	Niue
Tokelau	Tokelau
Norway: three entities
Norway	Bouvet Island
Norway	Jan Mayen
Norway	Svalbard
United Kingdom: 17 entities
United Kingdom	Akrotiri
United Kingdom	Dhekelia
Anguilla	Anguilla
Bermuda	Bermuda
British Indian Ocean Territory	British Indian Ocean Territory
British Virgin Islands	British Virgin Islands
Cayman Islands	Cayman Islands
Falkland Islands	Falkland Islands
Gibraltar	Gibraltar
Guernsey	Guernsey
Jersey	Jersey
Isle of Man	Isle of Man
Montserrat	Montserrat
Pitcairn Islands	Pitcairn Islands
Saint Helena	Saint Helena, Ascension, and Tristan da Cunha
South Georgia and the South Sandwich Islands	South Georgia and South Sandwich Islands
Turks and Caicos Islands	Turks and Caicos Islands
United States: 14 entities
United States	Baker Island^{[B]}
United States	Howland Island^{[B]}
United States	Jarvis Island^{[B]}
United States	Johnston Atoll^{[B]}
United States	Kingman Reef^{[B]}
United States	Midway Islands^{[B]}
United States	Navassa Island
United States	Palmyra Atoll^{[B]}
United States	Wake Island
American Samoa	American Samoa
Guam	Guam
Northern Mariana Islands	Northern Mariana Islands
Puerto Rico	Puerto Rico
United States Virgin Islands	Virgin Islands

=== Miscellaneous ===
This category is for Antarctica and places in dispute. There are five entities here:

- Antarctica
- Gaza Strip
- Paracel Islands
- Spratly Islands
- West Bank

=== Other entities ===
This category is for the World and the oceans. There are five oceans and the World (the World entry is intended as a summary of the other entries):

- Arctic Ocean
- Atlantic Ocean
- Indian Ocean
- Pacific Ocean
- Southern Ocean
- World

== Changes in The World Factbook ==
This table lists changes in the entities in the Factbook. Entities that have been added are in green; dropped entities are in red; the flag last used by the entity is shown as well. Entities that have changed their name are in blue; entities that have been redirected and consolidated into another entry are in purple.

Name of entity	Date change was made	Comments	Reference
Antarctica	1988	one of more than 40 entities added to the Factbook in order to provide a complete picture of the world	
Arctic Ocean	1988	one of more than 40 entities added to the Factbook in order to provide a complete picture of the world	
Atlantic Ocean	1988	one of more than 40 entities added to the Factbook in order to provide a complete picture of the world	
Indian Ocean	1988	one of more than 40 entities added to the Factbook in order to provide a complete picture of the world	
Pacific Ocean	1988	one of more than 40 entities added to the Factbook in order to provide a complete picture of the world	
World	1988	one of more than 40 entities added to the Factbook in order to provide a complete picture of the world	
Soviet Union	1992	dropped	
Yugoslavia	1992	dropped	
Iraq-Saudi Arabia Neutral Zone	1992	dropped	
Armenia	1992	replaced the Soviet Union in the Factbook	
Azerbaijan	1992	replaced the Soviet Union in the Factbook	
Belarus	1992	replaced the Soviet Union in the Factbook	
Estonia	1992	replaced the Soviet Union in the Factbook	
Georgia	1992	replaced the Soviet Union in the Factbook	
Kazakhstan	1992	replaced the Soviet Union in the Factbook	
Kyrgyzstan	1992	replaced the Soviet Union in the Factbook	
Latvia	1992	replaced the Soviet Union in the Factbook	
Lithuania	1992	replaced the Soviet Union in the Factbook	
Moldova	1992	replaced the Soviet Union in the Factbook	
Russia	1992	replaced the Soviet Union in the Factbook	
Tajikistan	1992	replaced the Soviet Union in the Factbook	
Turkmenistan	1992	replaced the Soviet Union in the Factbook	
Ukraine	1992	replaced the Soviet Union in the Factbook	
Uzbekistan	1992	replaced the Soviet Union in the Factbook	
Bosnia and Hercegovina	1992	replaced Yugoslavia in the Factbook	
Croatia	1992	replaced Yugoslavia in the Factbook	
Macedonia	1992	replaced Yugoslavia in the Factbook	
Serbia and Montenegro^{[C]}	1992	replaced Yugoslavia in the Factbook	
Slovenia	1992	replaced Yugoslavia in the Factbook	
Czechoslovakia	1993	dropped after the country splits into the Czech Republic and Slovakia	
Czech Republic	1993	added after Czechoslovakia splits	
Slovakia	1993	added after Czechoslovakia splits	
Eritrea	1993	added upon independence from Ethiopia	
Vatican City	1993	renamed Holy See (Vatican City)	
Ivory Coast	1993	renamed Cote d'Ivoire	
Macedonia	1994	renamed The Former Yugoslav Republic of Macedonia	
Pacific Islands, Trust Territory of the (Palau)	1995	renamed Palau	
Kazakhstan	1996	renamed Kazakstan; spelling changed	
Burkina	1996	renamed Burkina Faso	
Corsica	1996	added	
Zaire	1997	renamed Congo, Democratic Republic of the	
Congo	1997	renamed Congo, Republic of the	
Corsica	1997	dropped	
Western Samoa	1998	renamed Samoa	
Kazakstan	1998	renamed Kazakhstan; spelling change	
Wake Island	1999	renamed Wake Atoll	
Wake Atoll	2000	renamed Wake Island	
Southern Ocean	2000	added	
Serbia and Montenegro	2001	renamed Yugoslavia	
East Timor	January 1, 2002	added	
Yugoslavia	March 19, 2003	renamed Serbia and Montenegro	
Macedonia, The Former Yugoslav Republic of	November 30, 2004	renamed Macedonia after a November 2004 decision to refer to the Former Yugoslav Republic of Macedonia as such	
Akrotiri	November 30, 2004	added because both Akrotiri and Dhekelia are dependencies and not lease areas	
Dhekelia	November 30, 2004	added because both Akrotiri and Dhekelia are dependencies and not lease areas	
European Union	December 16, 2004	added due to the fact the European Union has nation like qualities	
Man, Isle of	January 10, 2006	renamed Isle of Man	
Baker Island	March 29, 2006	redirected and consolidated in United States Pacific Island Wildlife Refuges entry	
Howland Island	March 29, 2006	redirected and consolidated in United States Pacific Island Wildlife Refuges entry	
Jarvis Island	March 29, 2006	redirected and consolidated in United States Pacific Island Wildlife Refuges entry	
Johnston Atoll	March 29, 2006	redirected and consolidated in United States Pacific Island Wildlife Refuges entry	
Kingman Reef	March 29, 2006	redirected and consolidated in United States Pacific Island Wildlife Refuges entry	
Midway Islands	March 29, 2006	redirected and consolidated in United States Pacific Island Wildlife Refuges entry	
Palmyra Atoll	March 29, 2006	redirected and consolidated in United States Pacific Island Wildlife Refuges entry	
United States Pacific Island Wildlife Refuges	March 29, 2006	a consolidation of the entries for Baker Island, Howland Island, Jarvis Island, Johnston Atoll, Kingman Reef, Midway Islands, and Palmyra Atoll	
Serbia and Montenegro	June 13, 2006	dropped due to independence of Montenegro	
Serbia	June 29, 2006	added due to independence of Montenegro	
Montenegro	June 29, 2006	added due to independence of Montenegro	
Bassas da India	September 7, 2006	consolidated in Iles Eparses entry	
Europa Island	September 7, 2006	consolidated in Iles Eparses entry	
Glorioso Islands	September 7, 2006	consolidated in Iles Eparses entry	
Juan de Nova Island	September 7, 2006	consolidated in Iles Eparses entry	
Tromelin Island	September 7, 2006	consolidated in Iles Eparses entry	
Iles Eparses	September 7, 2006	a consolidation of the entries for Bassas da India, Europa Island, Glorioso Islands, Juan de Nova Island, and Tromelin Island	
French Guiana	January 18, 2007	dropped because the area is now an Overseas region and a part of France proper	
Guadeloupe	January 18, 2007	dropped because the area is now an Overseas region and a part of France proper	
Martinique	January 18, 2007	dropped because the area is now an Overseas region and a part of France proper	
Reunion	January 18, 2007	dropped because the area is now an Overseas region and a part of France proper	
Saint Barthelemy	July 19, 2007	added due to the fact the area is now an Overseas collectivity of France	
Saint Martin	July 19, 2007	added due to the fact the area is now an Overseas collectivity of France	
Bassas da India	July 19, 2007	dropped because the area is now part of the Iles Eparses district of the French Southern and Antarctic Lands	
Europa Island	July 19, 2007	dropped because the area is now part of the Iles Eparses district of the French Southern and Antarctic Lands	
Glorioso Islands	July 19, 2007	dropped because the area is now part of the Iles Eparses district of the French Southern and Antarctic Lands	
Juan de Nova Island	July 19, 2007	dropped because the area is now part of the Iles Eparses district of the French Southern and Antarctic Lands	
Tromelin Island	July 19, 2007	dropped because the area is now part of the Iles Eparses district of the French Southern and Antarctic Lands	
Iles Eparses	July 19, 2007	dropped because the area is now part of the Iles Eparses district of the French Southern and Antarctic Lands	
East Timor	July 19, 2007	renamed Timor-Leste due to a decision of the US Board on Geographic Names (BGN) to use the latter instead of the former	
Kosovo	February 28, 2008	added	
South Georgia and the South Sandwich Islands	September 1, 2009	renamed South Georgia and South Sandwich Islands	
Saint Helena	January 15, 2010	renamed Saint Helena, Ascension, and Tristan da Cunha	
Netherlands Antilles	October 12, 2010	dropped after the Netherlands Antilles dissolves.	
Curacao	October 20, 2010	added after the Netherlands Antilles dissolves	
Sint Maarten	October 20, 2010	added after the Netherlands Antilles dissolves	
Mayotte	April 8, 2011	dropped because the area is now an Overseas department and a part of France proper	
South Sudan	July 11, 2011	added following independence from Sudan	
Cape Verde	January 7, 2014	renamed Cabo Verde	
Swaziland	May 25, 2018	renamed Eswatini	
Macedonia	February 19, 2019	renamed North Macedonia	

== Notes ==
^{B} These entities have been consolidated into the United States Pacific Island Wildlife Refuges entry.

^{C} On April 27, 1992, Serbia and Montenegro, the final two republics of the Socialist Federal Republic of Yugoslavia (SFRY), formed a new nation, the Federal Republic of Yugoslavia (FRY). Until 2001, the U.S. Government did not recognize the FRY as a state. The U.S. government also decided not to accept the FRY or any the other republics as a successor state to the SFRY.

== See also ==
- The World Factbook
