= List of renamed places in Mozambique =

This is a list of renamed places in Mozambique. During the Portuguese colonial period, several places had their African names changes to honor Portuguese people or places. Other settlements were simply founded by the Portuguese and named as such. After Mozambican independence in 1975, a number of cities, towns, streets, and other places were renamed, replacing Portuguese names with African names. The country itself was renamed Mozambique upon independence, having previously been called Portuguese Mozambique or Portuguese East Africa.

== Provinces ==
Until 1978, Mozambique's provinces were called districts.

- Lourenço Marques District → Maputo Province (1976)
- Moçambique District → Nampula Province (1975)

== Cities and towns ==
- António Enes → Angoche (1976)
- Chiveve → Beira (1907)
- Vila Gouveia → Catandica (1975)
- Malvérnia → Chicualacuala (1975)
- Mandigos → Vila Pery (1916) → Chimoio (1975)
- Vila Trigo de Morais → Chokwe (1997)
- Kuamba → Cuamba (1937) → Nova Freixo (1952) → Cuamba (1976)
- Gurúè → Vila Junqueiro (1959) → Gurúè (1975)
- Vila Cabral → Lichinga (1975)
- Lourenço Marques → Maputo (1976)
- Vila Luísa → Marracuene (1975)
- Salazar → Matola (1975)
- Porto Amélia → Pemba (1975)
- João Belo → Xai-Xai (1975)
- Quissico → Zavala (1975)

== Streets ==
=== Maputo ===
In 1975, many street names were changed in Maputo. They are listed below, translated into English:

- Sagres Street → 10 November Avenue (1975)
- João Albasini Square → 21 October Square (1975)
- 7 March Square → 25 June Square (1975)
- Avenue of the Republic → 25 September Avenue (1975)
- Afonso de Albuquerque Avenue → Ahmed Sekou Touré Avenue (1975)
- 31 January Avenue → Agostinho Neto Avenue (1975)
- Luciano Cordeiro Avenue → Albert Luthuli Avenue (1975)
- Pêro de Alenquer Street → Amílcar Cabral Avenue (1975)
- Aviadores Street → Argélia Street (1975)
- Couceiro da Costa Avenue → Armando Tivane Avenue (1975)
- Major Araújo Street → Bagamoyo Street (1975)
- General Bettencourt Avenue → Base Ntchinga Street (1975)
- Pêro da Covilhã Street → Belmiro O. Muianga Street (1975)
- Pinheiro Chagas Avenue → Eduardo Mondlane Avenue (1975)
- Doutor Serrão Avenue → Emília Daússe Avenue (1975)
- Paiva Manso Avenue → Filipe Samuel Magaia Avenue (1975)
- Belegard da Silva Avenue → Francisco O. Magumbwé Avenue (1975)
- Avenue of the Dukes of Connaught → Friedrich Engels Avenue (1975)
- Andrade Corvo Avenue → Ho Chi Minh Avenue (1975)
- Mouzinho de Albuquerque Square → Independence Square (1975)
- Lapa Street → Joaquim Lapa Street (1975)
- 5 October Avenue → Josina Machel Avenue (1975)
- Guerra Junqueiro Street → José Mateus Street (1975)
- António Enes Avenue → Julius Nyerere Avenue (1975)
- Manuel de Arriaga Avenue → Karl Marx Avenue (1975)
- Aires de Ornelas Street → Kassuende Street (1975)
- Our Lady of Fátima Avenue → Kenneth Kaunda Avenue (1975)
- General Rosado Street → Kim Il Sung Avenue (1975)
- Mendonça Barreto Avenue → Limpopo River Avenue (1975)
- Diogo Cão Avenue → Lucas Luali Avenue (1975)
- General Craveiro Lopes Avenue → Lusaka Accord Avenue (1975)
- Porto Street → Malhangalene Street (1975)
- Latino Coelho Avenue → Maguiguana Avenue (1975)
- Governor Simas Street → Mateus Sansão Muthemba Street (1975)
- 18 May Avenue → Avenue of the Martyrs of Inhaminga (1975)
- Fernandes Tomaz Avenue → Avenue of the Martyrs of Machava (1975)
- Bartolomeu Dias Street → Avenue of the Martyrs of Mueda (1975)
- Paiva de Andrada Avenue → Mahomed Siad Barre Avenue (1975)
- Massano de Amorim Avenue → Mao Tsé Tung Avenue (1975)
- Dom Manuel I Avenue → Marginal Avenue (1975)
- Caldas Xavier Avenue → Marian N'gouabi Avenue (1975)
- António de Oliveira Salazar Street → Mesquita Street (1975)
- Lisbon Street → Milagre Mabote Avenue (1975)
- Eduardo Costa Street → Mukumbura Street (1975)
- João das Regras Street → Nachingwea Street (1975)
- Nevala Street → Nkwam Nkruma Avenue (1975)
- Consiglieri Pedroso Street → October Revolution Street (1975)
- Anchieta Avenue → Olof Palme Avenue (1975)
- Dr. Brito Camacho Street → Patrice Lumumba Avenue (1975)
- Gomes Freire Avenue → Paulo Samuel Kankhomba Avenue (1975)
- General Machado Avenue → Avenue of the People's War (1975)
- Street of the Heroes of Marracuene → Resistance Avenue (1975)
- Fonte Luminosa Square → Robert Mugabe Square (1975)
- João de Deus Avenue → Romão Fernandes Farinha Avenue (1975)
- Princesa Patrícia Street → Salvador Allende Avenue (1975)
- Dom Luís I Avenue → Samora Machel Avenue (1975)
- Almirante Canto e Castro Avenue → Tanzania Avenue (1975)
- Lidemburgo Street → Tembe River Avenue (1975)
- Alexandre Herculano Street → Timor Leste Avenue (1975)
- General Botha Street → Tomás Nduda Avenue (1975)
- Augusto de Castilho Avenue → Vladimir Lenin Avenue (1975)
- Azeredo Square → MacMahon Square → Workers' Square (1975)
- Alves Correia Avenue → Zambia Avenue (1975)
- Álvares Cabral Avenue → Zedequias Manganhela Avenue (1975)

== Other places ==
=== Maputo ===
- Manuel Rodrigues Cinema → África Theater (1975)
- Banco Nacional Ultramarino Building → Bank of Mozambique Building (1975)
- Lar Moderno Building → Center of Brazilian Studies
- Infante Cinema → Charlot Cinema (1975)
- Fazenda Building → Council of Ministers Building (1975)
- Joaquim de Araújo School → Estrela Vermelha Secondary School (1975)
- António Enes School → Francisco Manyanga Secondary School (1975)
- Hotel Clube → Franco-Mozambican Cultural Center
- Hotel Turismo → Hotel Ibis (1975)
- Funchal Building → Hotel Rovuma (1975)
- Salazar School → Josina Machel Secondary School (1975)
- Oliveira Salazar Stadium → Machava Stadium (1975)
- Dicca Cinema → Matchedje Cine (1975)
- Gago Coutinho Airport → Mavalane Airport (1975)
- Lourenço Marques Sporting Club → Maxaquene Sports Club (1975)
- Vasco da Gama Market → Municipal Market (1975)
- Amarela House → National Coin Museum (1975)
- Cabaret Aquarium → National School of Dance (1975)
- Álvaro de Castro Museum → Natural History Museum (1975)
- Club of Sport Fishing → Nautical School of Mozambique (1975)
- Atneu Grego Building → Palace of Weddings
- José Cabral Park → Park of the Continuadores (1975)
- General Machado School → Pedagogical University (1975)
- Directorate-General for Customs Building → Rectory of Eduardo Mondlane University (1975)
- Vasco da Gama Gardens → Tunduru Gardens (1975)

=== Elsewhere ===
- English River → Espírito Santo estuary (??)
- Delagoa Bay → Maputo Bay (1975)
