= List of renamed cities in Kyrgyzstan =

The following is the list of cities in Kyrgyzstan that underwent a name change in the past.

- Rybachye → Ysyk-Kel (1989) → Balykchy (1992)
- Karakol → Przhevalsk (1889) → Karakol (1921) → Przhevalsk (1939) → Karakol (1991)
- Pishpek → Frunze (1926) → Bishkek (1991)
- Jalal-Abad → Manas (2025)

== See also ==
- List of renamed cities in Kazakhstan
- List of renamed cities in Tajikistan
- List of renamed cities in Turkmenistan
- List of renamed cities in Uzbekistan
