= List of renamed cities in Tajikistan =

The following is the list of cities in Tajikistan that underwent a name change in the past.

- Dushanbe → Stalinabad (1929) → Dushanbe (1961)
- Khodjend → Leninabad (1939) → Khujand (1991)
- Kurgan-Tyube → Qurghonteppa (1993) → Bokhtar (2018)
- Sovietabad → Ghafurov (1978)
- Ura-Tyube → Istaravshan (2001)
- Yangi-Bazar → Orjonikidzeabad (1936) → Kofarnihon (1992) → Vahdat (2003)
- Tabashar → Istiqlol (2012)
- Nurek → Norak (1993)
- Kulyab → Kulob (1993)
- Regar → Tursunzade (1972) → Tursunzoda (1993)
- Chkalovsk → Chkalov (1993) → Buston (2016)
- Pendjikent → Panjakent (1993)
- Kalininabad → Sarband (1996) → Levakant

== See also ==
- List of renamed cities in Kazakhstan
- List of renamed cities in Kyrgyzstan
- List of renamed cities in Turkmenistan
- List of renamed cities in Uzbekistan
