= List of renamed cities in Estonia =

This is a list of cities in Estonia that underwent a name change in the past.

- Kuressaare → Kingissepa (1952) → Kuressaare (1988)
- Reval/Revel → Tallinna (1918) → Tallinn (early 1920s)
- Dorpat/Derpt → Jurjev (1893) → Tartu (1918)
- Pernau → Pärnu (1918)
- Gewi/Jewe → Jõhvi (1918)
- Walk → Valga (1918)

== See also ==
- List of renamed cities in Latvia
- List of renamed cities in Lithuania
