= List of renamed cities in Kazakhstan =

The following is the list of cities in Kazakhstan that underwent a name change in the past.

- Yasi → Shavgar (?) → Turkestan (Kazakh: Түркістан) (?)
- Novopetrovskoye → Fort Alexandrovsky (1857) → Fort-Shevchenko (Kazakh: Форт-Шевченко) (1939)
- Ayakoz → Sergiopol (1860) → Ayagoz (Kazakh: Аягөз) (1939)
- Aktau → Shevchenko (1964) → Aktau (Kazakh: Ақтау) (1991)
- Dzharkent → Panfilov (1942) → Zharkent (Kazakh: Жаркент) (1991)
- Guryev → Atyrau (Kazakh: Атырау) (1991)
- Yaitsk → Uralsk (1775) → Oral (Kazakh: Орал) (1991)
- Verniy → Alma-Ata (1921) → Almaty (Kazakh: Алматы) (1992)
- Dzhezkazgan → Zhezkazgan (Kazakh: Жезқазған) (1992)
- Novy Uzen → Zhanaozen (Kazakh: Жаңаөзен) (1992)
- Ust-Kamennaya → Ust-Kamenogorsk (1868) → Oskemen (Kazakh: Өскемен) (1992)
- Chu → Shu (Kazakh: Шу) (1992)
- Yermak → Aksu (Kazakh: Ақсу) (1993)
- Stanitsa Kokchetavskaya → Kokchetav (1868) → Kokshetau (Kazakh: Көкшетау) (1993)
- Gavrilovka → Taldy-Kurgan (1920) → Taldykorgan (Kazakh: Талдықорған) (1993)
- Chimkent → Shymkent (Kazakh: Шымкент) (1993)
- Leninsk → Baikonur (Kazakh: Байқоңыр) (1995)
- Ak-Mechet → Fort-Perovsky (1853) → Perovsk (1858) → Kyzyl-Orda (1925) → Kyzylorda (Kazakh: Қызылорда) (1996)
- Alexeyevka → Akkol (Kazakh: Ақкөл) (1997)
- Kustanay → Kostanay (Kazakh: Қостанай) (1997)
- Talas → Aulie-Ata (1856) → Mirzoyan (1936) → Jambul (1938) → Zhambyl (1993) → Taraz (Kazakh: Тараз) (1997)
- Aktyubinsk → Aktobe (Kazakh: Ақтөбе) (1999)
- Ridder → Leningorsk (1941) → Ridder (Kazakh: Риддер) (2002)
- Semipalatinsk → Semey (Kazakh: Семей) (2007)
- Akmolinsk → Tselinograd (1961) → Akmola (1992) → Astana (Kazakh: Астана) (1998) → Nur-Sultan (Kazakh: Нұр-Сұлтан) (2019) → Astana (Kazakh: Астана) (2022)

== See also ==
- List of renamed cities in Kyrgyzstan
- List of renamed cities in Tajikistan
- List of renamed cities in Turkmenistan
- List of renamed cities in Uzbekistan
