= List of renamed cities in Uzbekistan =

The following is the list of cities in Uzbekistan that have undergone a name change in the past.

- Karmine → Navoiy (1958)
- Rishdan → Kuybishevo → Rishtan (1977)
- Leninsk → Asaka (1938)
- Maracanda → Samarqand
- Novy Margelan → Skobelev (1910) → Fargʻona (1924)
- Qarabagish → Sovetobod (1972) → Xonobod

== See also ==
- List of renamed cities in Kazakhstan
- List of renamed cities in Kyrgyzstan
- List of renamed cities in Tajikistan
- List of renamed cities in Turkmenistan
