= List of cities and towns in East Prussia =

List of cities and towns in East Prussia, as used before 1945:

Note that some cities were part of the province periodically.

City/Town	District (Kreis)	Pop. in 1939	Current name	Current country	Current administrative unit
Allenburg	Landkreis Wehlau	2 694	Druzhba	Russia	Kaliningrad Oblast
Allenstein	Landkreis Allenstein	50 396	Olsztyn	Poland	Warmian-Masurian Voivodeship
Angerburg	Landkreis Angerburg	10 922	Węgorzewo (Węgobork)	Poland	Warmian-Masurian Voivodeship
Arys	Landkreis Johannisburg	3 553	Orzysz	Poland	Warmian-Masurian Voivodeship
Barten	Landkreis-Rastenburg	1 541	Barciany	Poland	Warmian-Masurian Voivodeship
Bartenstein	Landkreis Bartenstein	12 912	Bartoszyce	Poland	Warmian-Masurian Voivodeship
Bischofsburg	Landkreis Rößel	8 463	Biskupiec	Poland	Warmian-Masurian Voivodeship
Bischofstein (Ostpreußen)	Rößel	3 163	Bisztynek	Poland	Warmian-Masurian Voivodeship
Braunsberg	Landkreis Braunsberg	21 142	Braniewo	Poland	Warmian-Masurian Voivodeship
Bugmünde	Plöhnen	10 026	Nowy Dwór Mazowiecki	Poland	Masovian Voivodeship
Chorzellen	Praschnitz	4 000	Chorzele	Poland	Masovian Voivodeship
Darkehmen/Angerapp	Landkreis Darkehmen		Ozyorsk	Russia	Kaliningrad Oblast
Domnau	Bartenstein		Domnovo	Russia	Kaliningrad Oblast
Elbing	Stadtkreis	85 952	Elbląg	Poland	Warmian-Masurian Voivodeship
Eydtkuhnen	Landkreis Stallupönen	4 922	Chernyshevskoye	Russia	Kaliningrad Oblast
Fischhausen	Landkreis Samland	3 879	Primorsk	Russia	Kaliningrad Oblast
Frauenburg (Ostpreußen)	Braunsberg	2 951	Frombork	Poland	Warmian-Masurian Voivodeship
Friedland (Ostpreußen)	Bartenstein		Pravdinsk	Russia	Kaliningrad Oblast
Gehlenburg	Johannisburg	2 623	Biała Piska	Poland	Warmian-Masurian Voivodeship
Gerdauen	Landkreis Gerdauen	5 118	Zheleznodorozhny	Russia	Kaliningrad Oblast
Gilgenburg	Landkreis Osterode	1 700	Dąbrówno	Poland	Warmian-Masurian Voivodeship
Goldap	Landkreis Goldap	12 786	Gołdap	Poland	Warmian-Masurian Voivodeship
Görtzen	Sichelberg	1 994	Żuromin	Poland	Masovian Voivodeship
Gumbinnen	Landkreis Gumbinnen	24 534	Gusev	Russia	Kaliningrad Oblast
Guttstadt	Landkreis Heilsberg	5 932	Dobre Miasto	Poland	Warmian-Masurian Voivodeship
Harnau	Sichelberg	4 786	Raciąż	Poland	Masovian Voivodeship
Heiligenbeil	Landkreis Heiligenbeil	12 100	Mamonovo	Russia	Kaliningrad Oblast
Heilsberg	Heilsberg	11 787	Lidzbark Warmiński	Poland	Warmian-Masurian Voivodeship
Heydekrug	Landkreis Heydekrug	4 836	Šilutė	Lithuania	Klaipėda County
Hohenburg	Schröttersburg	4 787	Wyszogród	Poland	Masovian Voivodeship
Hohenstein	Osterode	4 245	Olsztynek	Poland	Warmian-Masurian Voivodeship
Insterburg	Landkreis Insterburg	48 711	Chernyakhovsk	Russia	Kaliningrad Oblast
Johannisburg	Johannisburg	6 322	Pisz (Jańsbork)	Poland	Warmian-Masurian Voivodeship
Königsberg (Preußen)	Stadtkreis	372 000	Kaliningrad	Russia	Kaliningrad Oblast
Kreuzburg (Ostpreußen)	Landkreis Preußisch Eylau		Slavskoye	Russia	Kaliningrad Oblast
Labiau	Landkreis Labiau	6 527	Polessk	Russia	Kaliningrad Oblast
Landsberg in Ostpreußen	Preußisch Eylau	3 120	Górowo Iławeckie	Poland	Warmian-Masurian Voivodeship
Liebemühl	Osterode	2 434	Miłomłyn	Poland	Warmian-Masurian Voivodeship
Liebstadt	Landkreis Mohrungen	2 742	Miłakowo	Poland	Warmian-Masurian Voivodeship
Lötzen	Landkreis Lötzen	16 288	Giżycko (Lec)	Poland	Warmian-Masurian Voivodeship
Lyck	Landkreis Lyck	16 482	Ełk	Poland	Warmian-Masurian Voivodeship
Mackeim	Mackeim	7 000	Maków Mazowiecki	Poland	Masovian Voivodeship
Marggrabowa/Treuburg	Landkreis Oletzko/Treuburg	7 114	Olecko	Poland	Warmian-Masurian Voivodeship
Marienburg in Westpreußen	Landkreis Marienburg (Westpr.)	27 318	Malbork	Poland	Pomeranian Voivodeship
Mehlsack	Braunsberg	4 393	Pieniężno (Melzak)	Poland	Warmian-Masurian Voivodeship
Memel	Stadtkreis	41 297	Klaipėda	Lithuania	Klaipėda County
Mohrungen	Mohrungen	5 500	Morąg	Poland	Warmian-Masurian Voivodeship
Mielau	Mielau	19 900	Mława	Poland	Masovian Voivodeship
Mühlhausen (Ostpreußen)	Landkreis Preußisch Holland	3 008	Młynary	Poland	Warmian-Masurian Voivodeship
Nasielsk	Ostenburg	7 365	Nasielsk	Poland	Masovian Voivodeship
Neidenburg	Landkreis Neidenburg	9 201	Nidzica (Nibork)	Poland	Warmian-Masurian Voivodeship
Nikolaiken	Landkreis Sensburg	2 627	Mikołajki	Poland	Warmian-Masurian Voivodeship
Nordenburg	Gerdauen	3 173	Krylovo	Russia	Kaliningrad Oblast
Ortelsburg	Landkreis Ortelsburg	14 234	Szczytno	Poland	Warmian-Masurian Voivodeship
Ostenburg	Ostenburg	17 401	Pułtusk	Poland	Masovian Voivodeship
Osterode (Ostpreußen)	Osterode	19 519	Ostróda	Poland	Warmian-Masurian Voivodeship
Passenheim	Ortelsburg	2 431	Pasym	Poland	Warmian-Masurian Voivodeship
Pillau	Samland	12 000	Baltiysk	Russia	Kaliningrad Oblast
Plöhnen	Plöhnen	12 000	Płońsk	Poland	Masovian Voivodeship
Praschnitz	Praschnitz	7 856	Przasnysz	Poland	Masovian Voivodeship
Preußisch Eylau	Preußisch Eylau	7 485	Bagrationovsk	Russia	Kaliningrad Oblast
Preußisch Holland	Preußisch Holland	6 345	Pasłęk	Poland	Warmian-Masurian Voivodeship
Ragnit	Landkreis Tilsit-Ragnit	10 094	Neman	Russia	Kaliningrad Oblast
Rastenburg	Rastenburg	19 634	Kętrzyn (Rastembork)	Poland	Warmian-Masurian Voivodeship
Rhein (Ostpreußen)	Lötzen	2 429	Ryn	Poland	Warmian-Masurian Voivodeship
Rößel	Rößel	5 000	Reszel	Poland	Warmian-Masurian Voivodeship
Rozan	Mackeim	4 876	Różan	Poland	Masovian Voivodeship
Saalfeld	Mohrungen	3 120	Zalewo	Poland	Warmian-Masurian Voivodeship
Scharfenwiese	Scharfenwiese	15 000	Ostrołęka	Poland	Masovian Voivodeship
Schippenbeil	Bartenstein	3 434	Sępopol	Poland	Warmian-Masurian Voivodeship
Schirwindt	Landkreis Pillkallen		Kutuzovo	Russia	Kaliningrad Oblast
Pillkallen/Schlossberg	Pillkallen		Dobrovolsk	Russia	Kaliningrad Oblast
Schröttersburg	Schröttersburg	35 200	Płock	Poland	Masovian Voivodeship
Seeburg	Rößel	3 022	Jeziorany (Zybork)	Poland	Warmian-Masurian Voivodeship
Sejny	Sudauen	3 405	Sejny	Poland	Podlaskie Voivodeship
Sensburg	Sensburg	9 877	Mrągowo (Żądzbork)	Poland	Warmian-Masurian Voivodeship
Serock	Ostenburg	6 500	Serock	Poland	Masovian Voivodeship
Sichelberg	Sichelberg	13 000	Sierpc	Poland	Masovian Voivodeship
Soldau	Neidenburg	5 349	Działdowo	Poland	Warmian-Masurian Voivodeship
Stallupönen	Stallupönen	6 608	Nesterov	Russia	Kaliningrad Oblast
Sudauen	Sudauen	23 066	Suwałki	Poland	Podlaskie Voivodeship
Tapiau	Wehlau	9 272	Gvardeysk	Russia	Kaliningrad Oblast
Tilsit	Stadtkreis	59 105	Sovetsk	Russia	Kaliningrad Oblast
Wartenburg (Ostpreußen)	Allenstein	5 841	Barczewo (Wartembork)	Poland	Warmian-Masurian Voivodeship
Wehlau	Wehlau	7 348	Znamensk	Russia	Kaliningrad Oblast
Willenberg	Ortelsburg	2 600	Wielbark	Poland	Warmian-Masurian Voivodeship
Wormditt	Braunsberg	7 817	Orneta	Poland	Warmian-Masurian Voivodeship
Zakroczym	Plöhnen	6 412	Zakroczym	Poland	Masovian Voivodeship
Zichenau	Zichenau	15 200	Ciechanów	Poland	Masovian Voivodeship
Zinten	Heiligenbeil		Kornevo	Russia	Kaliningrad Oblast

This article is a translation of the German Wikipedia's Liste der Städte in Ostpreußen article.

== See also ==
- List of city name changes overview
- German exonyms
- List of European exonyms
- German exonyms (Kaliningrad Oblast)
- List of settlements in Kaliningrad Oblast
- List of renamed cities and towns in Russia
- List of renamed cities in Lithuania
