= List of renamed cities in Turkmenistan =

The following is the list of cities in Turkmenistan that underwent one or more name changes in the past. Years in parentheses indicate the year a name was changed. A question mark (?) indicates the date of name change is needed.

- Amul → Charjuy (?) → Leninsk (1924) → Charjuy = Charjou = Çärjew (1927) → Turkmenabat (1999)
- Askhabad → Poltoratsk (1919) → Ashgabat (1927)
- Bäherden → Baharly (2003) → Bäherden (2018)
- Bekdaş → Garabogaz (2002)
- Çarşaňňy → Köýtendag (1999)
- ~~Çeleken → Hazar~~
- Çetili → Sakarçäge (?)
- Dargan-Ata → Birata (?) → Darganata (2017)
- Gazanjyk = Kazandzhik (1895) → Bereket (1999)
- Gowurdak → Magdanly (?)
- Gyzyl-arbat = Kizil-arvat → Serdar (1999) → Gyzylarbat (2022)
- Kalinin → Boldumsaz (1993)
- Ganlygala → Aleksandrov (~1890) → Kara Kala = Garrygala (~1924) → Magtymguly (2004)
- Kerki → Atamyrat (1999) → Kerki (2017)
- Kirovsk → Babadaýhan (1992)
- Shagadam → Kyzyl-Su → Krasnovodsk (1869) → Turkmenbashy (1993)
- Kushka = Guşgy (1885) → Serhetabat (1999)
- Neftedag (1933) → Nebit-dag (1946) → Balkanabat (2001)
- Neftezavodsk (1973) → Seýdi (1990)
- Oktyabrsk → Saparmyrat Türkmenbaşy adyndaky (1993)
- Şehitli → Şatlyk (1971)
- Stalino (1940?) → Moskovskiy (1961) → Murgap (?)
- Täzä Bazar → imeni Andreyeva (1938) → Andreyevsk (194?) → Täzebazar (1957) → Nyýazow (1993) → Şabat (2022)
- Täzä-Gala → imeni Telmana (1938) → Telmansk (1949) → Gubadag (1993)
- Tejen State Farm → Bereket (~1993) → Altyn Asyr (2000)
- Yuzhnyy → Dostluk (?)
- Ýylanly → Gurbansoltan Eje (2004) → Andalyp (2022)

== See also ==
- List of cities in Turkmenistan
- List of cities, towns and villages in Turkmenistan
- List of renamed cities in Kazakhstan
- List of renamed cities in Kyrgyzstan
- List of renamed cities in Tajikistan
- List of renamed cities in Uzbekistan
