= List of cities renamed by Azerbaijan =

The following is a list of cities renamed by Azerbaijan in the recent past.

- Mardakert → Ağdərə (1991)
- Aşağı Ağcakənd → Şaumyanovsk (1938) → Aşağı Ağcakənd (1990)
- Astraxan-Bazar → Cəlilabad (1967)
- Beyləqan → Zhdanov (1939) → Beyləqan (1991)
- Biləsuvar → Puşkino (1938) → Biləsuvar (1991)
- Dəvəçi → Şabran (2010)
- Duvannı → Sanqaçal
- Gəncə → Elisabethpol (1805) → Gəncə (1918) → Kirovabad (1935) → Gəncə (1989)
- Goranboy → Qasım-İsmayılov (1938) → Goranboy (1990)
- Helenendorf → Yelenino → Xanlar (1938) → Göygöl (2008)
- Karyagino → Füzuli (1959)
- Krasnaya Sloboda → Qırmızı Qəsəbə (1991)
- Xonaşen → Martuni → Xocavənd (1991)
- Noraşen → İliç[evsk] → Şərur (1991)
- Petropavlovka → Petropavlovsk → Sabirabad (1931)
- Port-Ilich → Liman (1999)
- Prishib → Göytəpə
- Qutqaşen → Qəbələ (1991)
- Qazı-Məmməd → Hacıqabul
- Şəki → Nuxa (1840) → Şəki (1968)
- Şəmkir → Şamxor → Şəmkir (1991)
- Tərtər → Mir-Bəşir (1949) → Tərtər (1991)
- Traubenfeld → Vinogradnoe Pole → Tovuz
- Vartaşen → Oğuz (1991)
- Xankəndi → Stepanakert (1923) → Xankəndi (1991)
- Yelizavetinka → Lüksemburq → Ağstafa (1939)
- Yeni Şamaxı → Ağsu
- Zubovka → Əli-Bayramlı (1938) → Şirvan (2008)
- Pirçivan → Zəngilan (1957)

== See also ==
- List of renamed cities in Armenia
- List of renamed cities in Georgia
