= List of renamed cities in Lithuania =

The following is the list of cities in Lithuania that underwent a name change in the past.

- Georgenburg → Jurbarkas
- Memel → Klaipėda (1923)
- Pašešupys → Starapolė (1736) → Marijampolė (1758) → Kapsukas (1956) → Marijampolė (1989)
- Šilokarčema → Šilutė (1923)
- Vilkmergė → Ukmergė (1920s)
- Medininkai → Varniai (16th century)
- Sniečkus → Visaginas (1992)
- Duoliebaičiai → Władysławów/Vladislavovas (1639) → Naumiestis → Kudirkos Naumiestis (1934)
- Zarasai → Novoalexandrovsk (1836) → Ežerėnai (1919) → Zarasai (1929)
- Mažeikiai → Muravyov (1899) → Mažeikiai (1918)

== See also ==
- List of cities and towns in East Prussia
- List of renamed cities in Estonia
- List of renamed cities in Latvia
