= List of renamed cities in Georgia =

The following is the list of cities in Georgia that underwent a name change in the past.

- Ağbulaq → Tetritsqaro (1940)
- Baghdati → Maiakovski (1940) → Baghdati (1990)
- Barmaqsız → Tsalka (1932)
- Başkeçid → Dmanisi (1947)
- Ninotsminda → Altunkale → Bogdanovka (1829) → Ninotsminda (1991)
- Dioscurias → Savastapolis → Tskhumi → Sohumkale → Sokhumi
- Elisabethtal → Asureti (1943)
- Chqondidi → Martvili → Gegechkori (1936) → Martvili (1990)
- Kvirila → Jugeli (1920) → Zestaponi (1921)
- Qarayazı → Gardabani (1947)
- Khashuri → Mikhailovo (1872) → Khashuri (1918) → Stalinisi (1931) → Khashuri (1934)
- Çörük Qəmərli → Katarinenfeld (1817) → Lüksemburgi (1921) → Bolnisi (1943)
- Stepantsminda → Kazbegi → Stepantsminda (2006)
- Akhalgori → Leningori (1935) → Akhalgori (1991)
- Ozurgeti → Makharadze (1922) → Ozurgeti (1990)
- Kharagauli → Orjonikidze → Kharagauli (1990)
- Sarvan → Borchalı (1929) → Marneuli (1947)
- Senaki → Mikha-Tskhakaia (1935) → Tskhakaia (1976) → Senaki (1989)
- Shulavery → Shahumiani (1925) → Shulaveri (1991)
- Trialeti → Molotovo (1940) → Trialeti (1957)
- Dedoplistskaro → Tsarskiye Kolodtsy (1803) → Tsitelitskaro (1921) → Dedoplistsqaro (1991)
- Tskhinvali → Staliniri (1934) → Tskhinvali (1961)
- Khoni → Tsulukidze (1936) → Khoni (1990)
- Tiflis → Tbilisi (1936)

== See also ==
- List of places named after Stalin
- List of renamed cities in Armenia
- List of renamed cities in Azerbaijan
