= List of renamed cities in Armenia =

The following is the list of cities in Armenia that underwent a name change in the past.

- Akhta → Hrazdan (1935)
- Aragats → Alagyoz → Tsakhkahovit → Aragats (1950)
- Artashat → Verin Ghamarlu → Artashat (1962)
- Vasakashen → Basarkechar → Vardenis (1945)
- Dadakishlag → Akhundov → Punik
- Davalou → Ararat (1935)
- Akhuryan → Dyuzkand → Akhuryan (1950)
- Geryusi → Goris (1924)
- Hamamlou → Spitak (1948)
- Jalaloghlou (from Jalalyan dynasty) → Stepanavan (1930)
- Ghapan → Kapan (1990)
- Karaklis → Kirovakan (1935) → Vanadzor (1993)
- Mikhaylovka (1835)→ Karmir Gyugh (1920)→ Krasnoselsk (1972) → Chambarak (1993)
- Kumayri → Alexandropol (1840) → Leninakan (1924) → Gyumri (1990)
- Kyavar → Novo-Bayazet/Nor Bayazet (1830) → Kamo (1959) → Gavar (1996)
- Lusavan → Charentsavan (1967)
- Mets Kznut → Nerkin Karanlough → Martuni (1926)
- Sardarabad/Sardarapat → Hoktemberyan (1932) → Armavir (1992)
- Soylan → Azizbekov (1956) → Vayk (1994)
- Nubarashen → Sovetashen → Nubarashen
- Hrazdan → Masis (1969)
- Uchkilsa → Vagharshapat → Echmiadzin (1941) → Vagharshapat (1995)
- Vorontsovka → Kalinino (1937) → Tashir (1991)

== See also ==
- List of renamed cities in Azerbaijan
- List of renamed cities in Georgia
