= List of shipwrecks in 2021 =

The list of shipwrecks in 2021 includes ships sunk, foundered, grounded, or otherwise lost during 2021.

table of contents
2021
Jan	Feb	Mar	Apr
May	Jun	Jul	Aug
Sep	Oct	Nov	Dec
Unknown date

== January ==
=== 2 January ===
List of shipwrecks: 2 January 2020
Ship	State	Description
Yong Yu Sing No. 18	Taiwan	The fishing boat—which had lost contact with Taiwanese authorities on 30 December 2020—was spotted floating near Midway Island. Upon further inspection by the United States Coast Guard, a lifeboat was missing, as were all ten crew. The ship was also damaged in what looked to be a collision. The boat was left adrift in the Pacific Ocean, and the U.S. Coast Guard continued to search for the missing crew. Of the ten on board, nine are of Indonesian nationality, and the captain is Taiwanese.

=== 12 January ===
List of shipwrecks: 12 January 2020
Ship	State	Description
Manoling 2	Philippines	The ferry with 78 people aboard ran ground near Danao, Cebu, Philippines, though all on board were safe. All 53 passengers were evacuated, and the ship had been towed to a safe position.
PNS Shah Jahan	Pakistan Navy	The Tariq-class destroyer was sunk as a target in the Arabian Sea.
Unidentified barge	Democratic Republic of the Congo	A barge carrying 262 people capsized in the Congo River killing six people and leaving 19 missing.

=== 13 January ===
List of shipwrecks: 13 January 2021
Ship	State	Description
Yong Feng	Panama	The bulk carrier was abandoned in the Philippine Sea 400 nautical miles (740 km; 460 mi) south-east of Miyakojima, Japan. Her 22 crew were rescued by a Taiwanese fishing vessel. She was on a voyage from Papua New Guinea to China.

=== 17 January ===
List of shipwrecks: 17 January 2021
Ship	State	Description
Arvin	Palau	The river/sea cargo ship broke in two, and sank in a storm at Bartın, Turkey. Out of the 13 people on board 4 were killed, 3 remained missing and 6 were rescued. Eleven on board were Ukrainian, and 2 were Russian.
Mermaid Challenger	Panama	The offshore supply tug developed a leak and sank in the Sulu Sea off Segama, Lahad Datu District, Borneo. Her crew of seven were rescued by the Royal Malaysian Navy.

=== 18 January ===
List of shipwrecks: 18 January 2021
Ship	State	Description
HM Foundation	Philippines	The derelict cargo ship was found ashore on Xijiyu Island, South Penghu Marine National Park, Taiwan, in the Taiwan Strait.

=== 19 January ===
List of shipwrecks: 19 January 2021
Ship	State	Description
Unidentified boat	Flag unknown	A boat capsized and sank off Libya after engine failure, killing 43 migrants. Ten others were rescued.

=== 21 January ===
List of shipwrecks: 21 January 2021
Ship	State	Description
John S. Dempster Jr.	United States	The 180-foot (55 m), 542-gross-register-ton menhaden-fishing boat was scuttled in the Atlantic Ocean in 125 feet (38 m) of water at a point equidistant—26 nautical miles (48 km; 30 mi)—from Cape May, New Jersey, Lewes, Delaware, and Ocean City, Maryland at 38°31.340′N 074°30.671′W to form part of an artificial reef system.

=== 23 January ===
List of shipwrecks: 23 January 2020
Ship	State	Description
Mitra Jaya XIX	Indonesia	The tug was sunk in a collision with the container ship Tanto Bersinar (Indonesia) in the Java Sea off Surabaya. Of eight crew, three crew rescued and five remain missing. A barge she was towing was damaged, with cargo leaking.

=== 24 January ===
List of shipwrecks: 24 January 2020
Ship	State	Description
Iba	Panama	The tanker dragged anchor in a strong wind during a storm overnight and drifted ashore at Umm Al Quwain, United Arab Emirates, in the Persian Gulf.

=== 27 January ===
List of shipwrecks: 27 January 2020
Ship	State	Description
Nicola Faith	United Kingdom	The small fishing boat sank off the coast of Colwyn Bay, Wales. The bodies of the three crewmembers were later found off the coast of Blackpool and the Wirral. The boat was raised on 31 May by the Marine Accident Investigation Branch (MAIB). In May 2026, the MAIB donated the wreck to Cranfield University for use as a training aid.
No.96 Oyang	South Korea	The South Korean-flagged fishing trawler caught fire and burned out south-east of Manila, Philippines. The crew of 24 were saved by nearby vessels, but the ship was abandoned.

=== 29 January ===
List of shipwrecks: 29 January 2020
Ship	State	Description
Samsung No. 1	South Korea	The cargo ship sprang a leak and sank four nautical miles (7.4 km; 4.6 mi) south-west of Cheongsando Island, Wando County, South Korea. The crew were rescued by Wando Maritime Rescue and Coast Guard.

=== 30 January ===
List of shipwrecks: 30 January 2021
Ship	State	Description
Cantika Persada	Indonesia	The cargo ship sprang a leak and sank after dragging anchor and contacting another ship at Gresik, Indonesia, partially above water. The crew evacuated.
Two unidentified boats	Colombia	Two boats sank off Tumaco, Colombia, killing 12, with at least 36 of the passengers rescued.

== February ==
=== 13 February ===
List of shipwrecks: 13 February 2021
Ship	State	Description
Greatship Rohini	India	The offshore supply vessel caught fire in the Arabian Sea. Three crew were killed. The fire was extinguished.
Tornagaleones	Chile	On the Tornagaleones River in Chile, the catamaran used in the construction of the Chacao Bridge capsized with over four crew aboard. Everyone was safely rescued.

=== 14 February ===
List of shipwrecks: 14 February 2021
Ship	State	Description
Unidentified boat or barge	Democratic Republic of the Congo	2021 Congo River disaster: During a voyage from Kinshasa to Mbandaka with more than 700 people on board, a boat or barge was wrecked when it struck a rock and capsized during the evening while operating illegally in darkness on the Congo River in Mai-Ndombe Province east of Kinshasa in the Democratic Republic of the Congo, killing at least 60 people and leaving 200 to 240 missing. About 300 people survived.

=== 17 February ===
List of shipwrecks: 17 February 2021
Ship	State	Description
King 2	Palau	The cargo ship sank in the Gulf of Sidra.

=== 20 February ===
List of shipwrecks: 20 February 2021
Ship	State	Description
KMP Bili	Indonesia	The ferry listed and partially capsized at dock and sank at the Perigi Piai Jetty, north of Pontianak, West Kalimantan, Indonesia. Rescuers confirmed that all 94 people aboard had been evacuated safely.

=== 24 February ===
List of shipwrecks: 24 February 2021
Ship	State	Description
Nehir	Palau	The tanker capsized in the Bay of Biscay off the coast of Galicia after the nine drug smugglers aboard opened the valves in the engine room after being intercepted by the Spanish Guardia Civil. The nine crew were taken off by a boarding team operating from Serviola (Spanish Navy) along with 3,000 kilograms (6,600 lb) of cocaine. After the crew and boarding team had disembarked, the ship capsized.

=== 26 February ===
List of shipwrecks: 26 February 2021
Ship	State	Description
KH 00737 TS	Vietnam	The fishing vessel was struck and sunk at anchor by Vietsun Confident (Vietnam) off Bình Thuận Province, north of Vũng Tàu in the South China Sea. All crew rescued.

== March ==
=== 3 March ===
List of shipwrecks: 3 March 2021
Ship	State	Description
Atlantic Destiny	Canada	The 43-metre (141 ft) scallop fishing vessel caught fire during the evening of 2 March while operating off the coast of Yarmouth, Nova Scotia, Canada. The fire knocked out the power in seas with 6–8-metre (20–26 ft) waves. After taking on water, all 31 crewmembers were rescued via helicopters from the Canadian and United States Coast Guards. Atlantic Destiny sank at 10:36 am on 3 March.

=== 7 March ===
List of shipwrecks: 7 March 2021
Ship	State	Description
Fajar Baru 8	Indonesia	The passenger ship burned at Sorong, West Papua, Indonesia. All crew rescued.
Lu Rong Yuan Yu 588	China	The tuna longliner fishing vessel ran aground on reefs of Pointe-aux-Sables, west of Port Louis, Mauritius. All crew were rescued by helicopter on 8 March.

=== 11 March ===
List of shipwrecks: 11 March 2021
Ship	State	Description
Dana Trader	Togo	The cargo ship sank in the Mediterranean Sea north of Abu Qir, Egypt. Nine crew were rescued by the Egyptian Navy, with one dead and one missing.
Volgo Balt 179	Comoros	The cargo ship sank in the Black Sea east of Constanţa, Romania, in stormy weather. Ten crew were rescued by the offshore support vessel GSP Falcon (Panama) with two dead and one missing.

=== 14 March ===
List of shipwrecks: 14 March 2021
Ship	State	Description
Bach Dang	Vietnam	The cargo ship sank, possibly after capsizing, off Mui Ne, Vietnam. All seven crew were rescued.

=== 18 March ===
List of shipwrecks: 18 March 2021
Ship	State	Description
Unidentified boat	Flag unknown	A wooden boat with a reported 100 migrants on board caught fire off Libya. Forty-five were rescued, 5 confirmed dead and remainder believed lost.

=== 20 March ===
List of shipwrecks: 20 March 2021
Ship	State	Description
Unidentified boat	United States	A 48-foot (15 m) vessel sank 5 miles (8.0 km) off the coast of La Push, Washington. Three men were rescued by a United States Coast Guard Station Quillayute River boat crew.

=== 23 March ===
List of shipwrecks: 23 March 2021
Ship	State	Description
Ever Given	Panama	Ever Given 2021 Suez Canal obstruction: The Evergreen G-class container ship ran aground in the Suez Canal in high winds during a sandstorm. She was refloated on 29 March.

=== 24 March ===
List of shipwrecks: 24 March 2021
Ship	State	Description
Melkart	Russia	The fishing trawler capsized and sank at dock at Kirkenes, Norway, partially submerged on her starboard side. All 26 crew were rescued.

=== 25 March ===
List of shipwrecks: 25 March 2021
Ship	State	Description
Futura	Italy	The fishing boat was sunk in a collision with the freighter Bergfjord (Albania) in the Adriatic Sea south-east of Ravenna, Italy. All four crew were rescued.

=== 27 March ===
List of shipwrecks: 27 March 2021
Ship	State	Description
Fen Yang 68	China	The cargo ship was sunk in a collision with the fish carrier Feng Hai 78 (China) off Ningde, Fujian Province, China, in the southern East China Sea. One crewman was rescued, six remain missing.

=== 30 March ===
List of shipwrecks: 30 March 2021
Ship	State	Description
Skorpion	Russia	The incomplete fishing factory trawler capsized and sank at dock at the Pella Shipyard, St. Petersburg, Russia, in the Neva River. Two workers were killed.
Two unidentified boats	United States	Two 40-foot (12 m) yachts sank on Vashon Island, Washington, after an explosion and fire at the marina.

== April ==
=== 1 April ===
List of shipwrecks: 1 April 2021
Ship	State	Description
You Hai 16	China	The cargo ship was sunk in a collision with Zhe Dai 66377 (China) off Zhoushan, Zhejiang Province, China, in the East China Sea. All six crew were rescued.

=== 3 April ===
List of shipwrecks: 3 April 2021
Ship	State	Description
Barokah Jaya	Indonesia	The fishing vessel was sunk in a collision with the cargo ship Habco Pioneer (Indonesia) north-east of Jakarta, in Indramayu Regency waters, West Java, in the Java Sea. Fifteen crew were rescued, 17 were declared missing.

=== 4 April ===
List of shipwrecks: 4 April 2021
Ship	State	Description
KMP Namparnos	Indonesia	Cyclone Seroja: The ferry struck the livestock carrier Camara Nusantara 6 (Indonesia) at Kupang and was abandoned by her crew. Both the crew of the livestock carrier and of the ferry were safe.
Rabit Al Hasan	Bangladesh	The ferry capsized and sank in a collision with a cargo ship in the Shitalakkhya River just outside Dhaka, Bangladesh. The vessel was raised. Thirty-four killed.

=== 5 April ===
List of shipwrecks: 5 April 2021
Ship	State	Description
KMP Jatra 1	Indonesia	Cyclone Seroja: The ferry was driven against the quayside and capsized at Kupang. Her 31 crew were rescued.

=== 6 April ===
List of shipwrecks: 3 April 2021
Ship	State	Description
Hellutangi	Antigua and Barbuda	The cargo ship was beached, wrecked, possibly on Vagar Island, probable total loss after dragging anchor in a storm.

=== 10 April ===
List of shipwrecks: 10 April 2021
Ship	State	Description
Haohang No. XXX	China	The coastal cargo ship was sunk in a collision with Hai Lan Zhong Gu 9 (China) near buoy 60 in Shizi Channel, upper channel of the Pearl River Delta/Estuary. All 13 crew were rescued.

=== 12 April ===
List of shipwrecks: 12 April 2021
Ship	State	Description
Rabbah or Rabbal	India	The fishing vessel was sunk in a collision with APL Le Havre (Singapore) in the Arabian Sea 42 nautical miles (78 km; 48 mi) off Mangaluru, Karnataka, India. Nine crew were declared missing, five crew were rescued, but three died later.

=== 13 April ===
List of shipwrecks: 13 April 2021
Ship	State	Description
Seacor Power	United States	The liftboat capsized in rough weather in the Gulf of Mexico whilst under way some five nautical miles (9.3 km; 5.8 mi) south of Port Fourchon, Louisiana. Thirteen crew were killed, including the captain, and six were rescued.

=== 14 April ===
List of shipwrecks: 14 April 2021
Ship	State	Description
Khang Anh 189	Vietnam	The cargo ship sank in the South China Sea 30 nautical miles (56 km; 35 mi) south of Vũng Tàu, Vietnam. Ten crew were rescued, one killed.

=== 18 April ===
List of shipwrecks: 18 April 2021
Ship	State	Description
Ghana	Mongolia	Typhoon Surigae: The cargo ship dragged anchor onto the breakwater at Catbalogan, Samar, Philippines.

=== 19 April ===
List of shipwrecks: 19 April 2021
Ship	State	Description
LCT Cebu Great Ocean	Philippines	Typhoon Surigae: The tank landing craft was driven ashore at Malimono, Surigao del Norte, Mindanao, Philippines. Four people were killed, seven were rescued, and nine were declared missing.

=== 21 April ===
List of shipwrecks: 21 April 2021
Ship	State	Description
KRI Nanggala	Indonesian Navy	The Cakra-class submarine sank north of Bali, Indonesia with the loss of all 53 crew.

=== 26 April ===
List of shipwrecks: 26 April 2021
Ship	State	Description
Alica	Mongolia	The container ship partially capsized and sank with most of the ship above water at Ho Chi Minh City's port, Nhà Bè, Vietnam.
Hassina	Kiribati	The abandoned/out-of-service cargo ship, at anchor for a year, drifted ashore at Toamasina (Tatamave), Madagascar.

== May ==
=== 2 May ===
List of shipwrecks: 2 May 2021
Ship	State	Description
Unnamed trawler	Flag unknown	A 40-foot (12 m) trawler smuggling migrants capsized in San Diego Bay, washed ashore and broke up on rocks. Three people were found to have died, and one person later died in the hospital. Around 25 people were rescued and hospitalized, including 1 in critical condition. The captain was detained.

=== 3 May ===
List of shipwrecks: 3 May 2021
Ship	State	Description
Unnamed speedboat	Bangladesh	A speedboat on the Padma River collided with a sand barge and sank, killing 26 people, and leaving several more injured and/or missing.

=== 4 May ===
List of shipwrecks: 4 May 2021
Ship	State	Description
NAGA-7	Malaysia	The jackup rig collapsed when one leg punched through the hard sea floor into soft mud off Sarawak, Borneo, Indonesia in the South China Sea. All crew safe.

=== 7 May ===
List of shipwrecks: 7 May 2021
Ship	State	Description
PL 94-9301	United States Air Force	The 93-foot (28 m) surplus water training vessel was sunk as an artificial reef 14 nautical miles (26 km; 16 mi) south-west of Destin, Florida in 104 feet (32 m) of water in the Gulf of Mexico (30°09′N 86°34′W). The reef was nicknamed "Big Dawg."

=== 15 May ===
List of shipwrecks: 15 May 2021
Ship	State	Description
Alliance	India	Cyclone Tauktae: The tugboat capsized in a cyclone and later sank in the Arabian Sea off Mangalore, India. One crewman was killed, five crew were declared missing, and two swam to shore.

=== 17 May ===
List of shipwrecks: 17 May 2021
Ship	State	Description
Gal Constructor	India	Cyclone Tauktae: The offshore barge ran aground in the cyclone in the Arabian Sea off Satpati, India. All 137 aboard were rescued by the Indian Coast Guard.
Papaa 305	St. Kitts and Nevis	Cyclone Tauktae: The accommodations/work barge sank in the cyclone in the Arabian Sea off Mumbai, India. 186 were rescued by INS Kolkata and INS Kochi (both Indian Navy). Sixty-five were declared missing and 22 dead.

=== 19 May ===
List of shipwrecks: 17 May 2021
Ship	State	Description
Minh Quang 03	Vietnam	The cargo ship struck a reef in the South China Sea off Cat Ba Island, near Hải Phòng, Vietnam. Sank or was beached to prevent sinking two miles (3.2 km) off Cat Ba Island. All nine crew were rescued.

=== 22 May ===
List of shipwrecks: 22 May 2021
Ship	State	Description
Chong Bong	North Korea	The cargo ship sprung a leak and sank in the Sea of Japan 27 nautical miles (50 km; 31 mi) north of Okinoshima, Oki Islands, Japan. The crew was rescued by the tanker Yujong 2 (North Korea).

=== 25 May ===
List of shipwrecks: 22 May 2021
Ship	State	Description
Hokko Maru No. 8	Japan	The Japanese fishing trawler from Mombetsu which had five people aboard, collided in foggy weather with the Russian cargo vessel Amur with 23 aboard. Three of the people on Hokko Maru No. 8 drowned, while the other two people were rescued by Amur.

=== 26 May ===
List of shipwrecks: 26 May 2021
Ship	State	Description
Matin 1	Iran	The cargo ship sank in the Strait of Hormuz. All crew were rescued in a joint operation between the tankers Tenacity IV and Adisa.

=== 27 May ===
List of shipwrecks: 27 May 2021
Ship	State	Description
Byakko	Japan	The ro-ro container ship was damaged in a collision with the chemical tanker Ulsan Pioneer (Marshall Islands) and later capsized and sank in the Sea of Japan, north-west of Imabari, Shikoku Island, Japan. Nine crew were rescued, her captain, chief and second engineer remain missing.
Unnamed boat	Nigeria	A boat carrying at least 150 people capsized resulting in 53 deaths and dozens missing in the northwestern Nigerian state of Kebbi.

=== 28 May ===
List of shipwrecks: 28 May 2021
Ship	State	Description
Cuban migrant vessel	Cuba	Nine people died and 13 people were rescued after a Cuban migrant vessel sank off the coast of Florida, near the Florida Keys archipelago.
Nazmiye Ana	Panama	The cargo ship capsized at dock in Castellón de la Plana, Spain with its superstructure on the bottom. Two crew missing.

=== 29 May ===
List of shipwrecks: 29 May 2021
Ship	State	Description
Chuang Xin 8	China	The cargo ship was sunk in a collision with Yi Gang Wu Mao 20 (China) south-east of Shanghai near Banyang Jiao Reef. Nineteen crew were rescued, one crew missing.
Five yachts	Flags unknown	Five luxury 20 m (66 ft) yachts were destroyed by fire at the Marina Kastela, near Split, Croatia. Three boats on fire were towed into Kastela Bay where two burned and sank, and one was beached and destroyed, two others burned in the marina. Eighteen others were damaged.

== June ==
=== 1 June ===
List of shipwrecks: 1 June 2021
Ship	State	Description
X-Press Pearl	Singapore	The container ship suffered an onboard explosion and caught fire off Colombo, Sri Lanka. Her crew were rescued on 25 May by the Sri Lankan Navy. She was burned out by 1 June and sank in 70 feet (21 m) of water with the superstructure above water.

=== 2 June ===
List of shipwrecks: 2 June 2021
Ship	State	Description
Inspecta 7	Egypt	The offshore supply tug sank in the Gulf of Suez off Ras Ghareb, Egypt after striking a sunken wreck. Eleven of 13 of her crew were rescued, but an engineer and her captain died.
IRIS Kharg	Islamic Republic of Iran Navy	The Ol-class tanker caught fire at 2:55 AM on 2 June and sank at Jask later that day. Her crew were rescued.

=== 5 June ===
List of shipwrecks: 5 June 2021
Ship	State	Description
Commodore	United States	The ferry ran aground near Bushwick Inlet Park, New York City due to a mechanical problem and took on water. One hundred passengers evacuated, 1 crewman injured.

=== 10 June ===
List of shipwrecks: 10 June 2021
Ship	State	Description
Ceará	Brazilian Navy	The decommissioned dock landing ship was sunk as a target off Cabo Frio in the South Atlantic.

=== 12 June ===
List of shipwrecks: 12 June 2021
Ship	State	Description
Titan 8	Flag unknown	The coastal cargo ship caught fire, suffered an explosion, capsized and sank at Delpan Wharf in the Pasig River, Manila, Philippines. Two crewmen missing, four crewman injured, plus two crewmen on a nearby cargo ship were injured.

=== 13 June ===
List of shipwrecks: 13 June 2021
Ship	State	Description
Unknown migrant boat	Flag unknown	A migrant boat sank off Yemen's Ras al-Ara area in southern Lahj Province. There were 150–200 on board, most are believed to have drowned.

=== 17 June ===
List of shipwrecks: 17 June 2021
Ship	State	Description
Mangalam	India	The coaster was pushed aground by storm on the coast of Raigad District south of Mumbai, India due to a mechanical problem and took on water. The ship's crew were rescued by the Indian Coast Guard.
Unknown fishing vessel	Flag unknown	A fishing vessel was sunk in a collision with the container ship AS Rosalia (Portugal) under the Yavuz Sultan Selim Bridge, Istanbul, in the Bosphorus Strait. Thirty-one crew were rescued, 1 was killed, and 1 other missing.

=== 20 June ===
List of shipwrecks: 20 June 2021
Ship	State	Description
Pioneer Star	Comoros	The cargo ship sank some 35 nautical miles (65 km; 40 mi) off the Oman coast in Arabian Sea. Most crew were rescued, at least one missing.

=== 29 June ===
List of shipwrecks: 29 June 2021
Ship	State	Description
KMP Yunicee	Indonesia	The ro-ro ferry with 57 aboard capsized and sank in the port of Gilimanuk, Bali Island, Indonesia. Seven people died, and 11 are missing.

== July ==
=== 1 July ===
List of shipwrecks: 1 July 2021
Ship	State	Description
Cappelletti	(Italy) Corps of the Port Captaincies – Coast Guard	The patrol boat burned and sank off Capo Bruzzano, Calabria after a fire broke out in its engine room. All nine crew were rescued.

=== 8 July ===
List of shipwrecks: 8 July 2021
Ship	State	Description
Palawan Pearl	Flag unknown	The coastal freighter was sunk in a collision with the utility vessel BKM 104 in Manila Bay, South Harbor Anchorage area, Philippines. She sank in shallow water only partially submerged.

=== 18 July ===
List of shipwrecks: 18 July 2021
Ship	State	Description
Dia	Flag unknown	The abandoned tanker, anchored off Aden, Yemen for some seven years, apparently abandoned and unmanned, sank or is sinking.

=== 21 July ===
List of shipwrecks: 21 July 2021
Ship	State	Description
Heng Tong 77	Panama	Heng Tong 77 The deck cargo ship dragged anchor in rough weather and drifted ashore at Karachi, Pakistan.

=== 22 July ===
List of shipwrecks: 22 July 2021
Ship	State	Description
Singa Besar 2801	Malaysia	The tow barge drifted hard aground in Mon State, Myanmar, south-east of Yangon, on the Andaman Sea after losing her tow.

=== 29 July ===
List of shipwrecks: 29 July 2021
Ship	State	Description
Brannon	United States	The 65-foot (20 m) steel-hulled experimental military fast response catamaran, was sunk as an artificial reef in the Gulf of Mexico in 250 feet (76 m) of water 16 nautical miles (30 km) south east of Destin, Florida.

=== 31 July ===
List of shipwrecks: 31 July 2021
Ship	State	Description
P33	Maritime Squadron of the Armed Forces of Malta	The decommissioned Bremse-class patrol boat was scuttled off Żonqor Point near Marsaskala, Malta as a diving attraction.

== August ==
=== 1 August ===
List of shipwrecks: 1 August 2021
Ship	State	Description
Tan Binh 127	Panama	The cargo ship sprang a leak and sank in the Andaman Sea some 150 nautical miles (280 km; 170 mi) north-west of Ko Phuket, Thailand. Eighteen crew left the ship in a lifeboat and were later rescued by the container ship MCC Chittagong (Hong Kong).

=== 5 August ===
List of shipwrecks: 5 August 2021
Ship	State	Description
Sam Bo II	Taiwan	Tropical Storm Lupit: The coaster was driven onto the breakwater at Budai, Chiayi, Taiwan during the tropical storm and sank. Nine crew were evacuated by mobile crane with basket, all are safe.

=== 6 August ===
List of shipwrecks: 6 August 2021
Ship	State	Description
Panamax Ostria	Cyprus	The bulk carrier ran aground south of Suez, Egypt in the Gulf of Suez. Still aground as of 16 August.

=== 12 August ===
List of shipwrecks: 12 August 2021
Ship	State	Description
Crimson Polaris	Panama	The cargo ship ran aground and broke in two at Hachinohe, Japan. Her 21 crew survived.
Unnamed yacht	United Kingdom	The yacht sank off Milos, Greece. All seventeen passengers on board were rescued.

=== 14 August ===
List of shipwrecks: 14 August 2021
Ship	State	Description
TTH 92206TS	Vietnam	The fishing vessel was sunk in a collision with the container ship Green Pacific (Vietnam) in the Gulf of Tonkin off Cồn Cỏ Island, Quảng Trị Province, Vietnam. Green Pacific rescued 7; two missing.
Unknown tanker	Indonesia	A bunkering tanker suffered an engine breakdown and drifted aground, and partially sank, with the ship's upper superstructure remaining above water off Banyutowo coast, Dukuhseti, Pati Regency, Java, in the Java Sea.

=== 15 August ===
List of shipwrecks: 15 August 2021
Ship	State	Description
USS Ingraham	United States Navy	The decommissioned Oliver Hazard Perry-class guided missile frigate was sunk as a target off Hawaii.
Lake Conroe Queen	United States	The double-decked stern wheel paddlewheel excursion/party boat turned on its side and sank partially above water in shallow water in high waves in a storm on Lake Conroe, Texas. All 53 on board were picked up but 1 passenger later died.

=== 19 August ===
List of shipwrecks: 19 August 2021
Ship	State	Description
Fulin 88	Sierra Leone	The cargo ship sprang a leak and sank in the Taiwan Strait between the Pescadores Islands and Yunlin County, Taiwan. All 10 crew left in life raft and were picked up.

=== 26 August ===
List of shipwrecks: 26 August 2021
Ship	State	Description
CEG Orbit	Latvia	The cargo ship was driven ashore between Cranstal and the Point of Ayre, Isle of Man. She was on a voyage from Liverpool to Belfast, County Antrim, United Kingdom. She was refloated the next day with assistance from the tugs Wendy Anne (Isle of Man) and CT Vector (United Kingdom) and taken in to Douglas, Isle of Man.

=== 28 August ===
List of shipwrecks: 28 August 2021
Ship	State	Description
Sea Bird	Togo	The cargo ship sank after striking rocks off Small Vrak, Karavi islets in the Sea of Crete east of the Peloponnese peninsula, Greece. The cargo ship Haya (Comoros) participated in search and rescue. All 16 crew rescued.

=== 29 August ===
List of shipwrecks: 29 August 2021
Ship	State	Description
ACL33415	United States	Hurricane Ida: The barge was driven ashore by the hurricane, probably in the Mississippi River south of New Orleans, Louisiana.
Atlantic Maya	Singapore	Hurricane Ida: The bulk carrier went aground during the hurricane at the Port of South Louisiana near La Place, Louisiana.
Chloe	United States	Hurricane Ida: The work boat was driven ashore by the hurricane, probably in the Mississippi River south of New Orleans, Louisiana.
Derby	Marshall Islands	Hurricane Ida: The bulk carrier went aground during the hurricane at the Port of South Louisiana near La Place, Louisiana.
IN085221	United States	Hurricane Ida: The barge was driven ashore by the Hurricane, probably in the Mississippi River south of New Orleans, Louisiana.
Nord Pollux	Panama	Hurricane Ida: The bulk carrier went aground during the hurricane at the Port of South Louisiana.
RTA2	United States	Hurricane Ida: The New Orleans Regional Transit Authority passenger ferry broke from mooring during Hurricane Ida and ran aground in the Mississippi River. Scheduled to be refloated when safe.
St. Vincent I	United States	Hurricane Ida: The shrimp boat partially sank on her port side in shallow water at Golden Meadow, Louisiana.
St. Vincent VII	United States	Hurricane Ida: The shrimp boat was driven ashore by the Hurricane in the area of Grand Isle, Louisiana.
Thomas Jefferson	United States	Hurricane Ida: The New Orleans Regional Transit Authority passenger ferry broke from moorings and ran aground in the Mississippi River. Scheduled to be refloated when safe.
UBC Tampico	Cyprus	Hurricane Ida: The bulk carrier went aground during the hurricane at the Port of South Louisiana near La Place, Louisiana.
Unknown barge	United States	Hurricane Ida: A barge broke from her mooring during Hurricane Ida and sank after striking the Kerner Swing Bridge in Bayou Barataria in Lafitte, Louisiana.
Unknown ferry	United States	Hurricane Ida: A ferry broke from mooring in Chalmette, Louisiana during Hurricane Ida and ran aground in the Mississippi River. Scheduled to be refloated when safe.
Unknown trawler	United States	Hurricane Ida: A 100-foot trawler broke from her mooring during Hurricane Ida and sank after striking the Kerner Swing Bridge in Bayou Barataria in Lafitte, Louisiana.
Unknown tugboat	United States	Hurricane Ida: A tugboat broke from her mooring during Hurricane Ida and sank after striking the Kerner Swing Bridge in Bayou Barataria in Lafitte, Louisiana.

== September ==
=== 8 September ===
List of shipwrecks: 8 September 2021
Ship	State	Description
Ma Kamala	India	Two passenger boats with around 120 passengers collided in and sank at Nimati Ghat in Jorhat.
Setia Abadi 2	Indonesia	The purse seiner caught fire in the Indian Ocean some 400 nautical miles (740 km; 460 mi) off Sumatra, Indonesia. Thirty-five crew were rescued by Pelicana (Norway), 4 crew are missing.

=== 14 September ===
List of shipwrecks: 14 September 2021
Ship	State	Description
My An 1	Vietnam	The cargo ship was sunk in a collision with Lisa Auerbach (Liberia) at Vũng Tàu, Vietnam in shallow water with the upper bridge above water. All 17 crew rescued by Lisa Auerbach.

=== 18 September ===
List of shipwrecks: 18 September 2021
Ship	State	Description
Freyja	Germany	The anchored 17.35-metre (56 ft 11 in) fishing vessel suffered a fire in her engine room in the evening of 17 September in the Wadden Sea south east of Amrum Island. She burned out and sank in shallow water (54°36′N 08°29′E) at 02:45 on 18 September. Her two crew were rescued by helicopter. The wreck was removed as a hazard to navigation 9–10 October 2021.

=== 21 September ===
List of shipwrecks: 21 September 2021
Ship	State	Description
Ramona	Germany	The 15.05-metre (49 ft 5 in) fishing vessel suffered sprung planks in the bow and sank off Northern Light Buoy No.8 Vogelsand (54°01′N 08°26′W). Her two crew and three scientists were rescued by Hoffnung (Germany). The wreck broke up on the bottom before salvage could be attempted.

=== 22 September ===
List of shipwrecks: 22 September 2021
Ship	State	Description
Unknown fishing vessel	China	A fishing vessel was sunk in a collision with the bulk carrier Xin Hai Zhou 26 (Panama) in the East China Sea some 30 nautical miles (56 km; 35 mi) south-east of Zhoushan, China. Four crew were rescued, one dead, two reported missing.

=== 24 September ===
List of shipwrecks: 24 September 2021
Ship	State	Description
LCT Lite Ferry 3 or Santiago De Bohal	The Philippines	The LCT ferry capsized and sank in shallow water while docking at Ormoc City, Cebu, the Philippines. Fifteen crew were rescued, one dead.

=== 29 September ===
List of shipwrecks: 29 September 2021
Ship	State	Description
Ivan	Madeira	The ro-ro cargo ship listed and sank in shallow water at Algiers, Algeria, with the vessel mostly above water. All 17 crew were safe.
Unidentified tugboat	Thailand	The river tug capsized while attempting to tow a barge in the Chao Phraya River at Bangkok, Thailand. Two crew were reported missing.

== October ==
=== 3 October ===
List of shipwrecks: 3 October 2021
Ship	State	Description
Unidentified fishing vessel	United States	Backwash from the auto ferry Chimacum capsized a squid fishing boat that had lost power in Elliott Bay off the coast of Seattle, Washington. Eleven people were rescued from the water.

=== 16 October ===
List of shipwrecks: 16 October 2021
Ship	State	Description
Rua II	Argentina	The tug was damaged in a collision with the tanker Punta Medanos (Argentina) while maneuvering the tanker at La Plata, Argentina. She was grounded at the edge of the channel where she sank in shallow water with a port list with the vessel mostly above water.

=== 18 October ===
List of shipwrecks: 18 October 2021
Ship	State	Description
Unknown tugboat	Ecuador	A tug capsized after a collision with the tall ship Cisne Branco ( Brazilian Navy). The tugboat was attempting to assist the tall ship after Cisne Branco collided with and got stuck under a pedestrian bridge connecting Guayaquil, Ecuador to Santay Island, Ecuador.

=== 23 October ===
List of shipwrecks: 23 October 2021
Ship	State	Description
INS Ranvijay	Indian Navy	The Rajput-class destroyer caught fire at Visakhapatnam Naval Base. Four of her crew were injured.
Zim Kingston	Malta	The container ship caught fire off Victoria, British Columbia, Canada. Most of her crew were evacuated by the Canadian Coast Guard. She was on a voyage from Busan, South Korea to Vancouver.

=== 25 October ===
List of shipwrecks: 25 October 2021
Ship	State	Description
Chem Alya	Liberia	The tanker ran aground off The Needles, Isle of Wight, United Kingdom. She was on a voyage from Fawley, Hampshire, United Kingdom to Egypt. She was refloated.

=== 29 October ===
List of shipwrecks: 29 October 2021
Ship	State	Description
Maju 9	Indonesia	The cargo ship capsized after a collision with the chemical tanker New Global (Indonesia) in the Arafura Sea south of the Aru Islands, Dobo, Maluku Province, Indonesia. Twenty-eight were rescued by New Global, 4 missing.

== November ==
=== 2 November ===
List of shipwrecks: 2 November 2021
Ship	State	Description
Gold Trans 308	Indonesia	The coal barge sprung a leak and developed a list, and was run aground, probably to prevent capsizing or sinking, on the Alas Purwo National Park coast, Banyuwangi Regency, eastern tip of Java, Indonesia.
O P K 3	Thailand	The container ship sank in shallow water partially above water after a collision with the container ship NP Pathum Thani (Thailand) in the Chao Phraya River, Bangkok, Thailand.

=== 3 November ===
List of shipwrecks: 3 November 2021
Ship	State	Description
Unknown fishing vessel	Japan	A fishing vessel sank after a collision with the concrete carrier Hekinan Maru (Japan) in the Pacific Ocean off Cape Muroto, island of Shikoku, Kochi Prefecture, Honshu. One crewman rescued, one body recovered.

=== 8 November ===
List of shipwrecks: 8 November 2021
Ship	State	Description
Suifuhang 628	China	The coastal container ship sank after springing a leak in her engine room in Shenzhen waters. Seven crew rescued.
Vissai VCT 12	Vietnam	The cargo ship dragged anchor and was driven ashore in a storm at Cửa Lò, Nghệ An Province, Vietnam, in the Gulf of Tonkin.

=== 9 November ===
List of shipwrecks: 9 November 2021
Ship	State	Description
Rise Shine	Panama	The container capable cargo ship drifted aground, suffering cracks in hull in a storm in Vostok Bay west of Nakhodka, Russia, in the Sea of Japan.

=== 12 November ===
List of shipwrecks: 12 November 2021
Ship	State	Description
Hangsheng 88	China	The cargo ship sank after springing a leak 40 nautical miles (74 km; 46 mi) off the coast of Huilai County, eastern coast of Guangdong Province, China in the South China Sea east of Hong Kong. Thirteen crew were rescued.

=== 15 November ===
List of shipwrecks: 15 November 2021
Ship	State	Description
Fardin 1	Bangladesh	The lighter sank in shallow water, partially above water, after a collision with the bulk carrier Handy Perth (Panama) in the Port of Mongla, Bangladesh. Three crew rescued, three missing.

=== 17 November ===
List of shipwrecks: 17 November 2021
Ship	State	Description
Hong Yun Da 58	China	The cargo ship sank after springing a leak 40 nautical miles (74 km; 46 mi) off the southern coast of Nangan Island, Matsu Islands, China in the southern East China Sea east of Fuzhou. All 11 crew were rescued, 2 by Taiwanese search and rescue, the rest by China.

=== 23 November ===
List of shipwrecks: 23 November 2021
Ship	State	Description
Sumber Cahaya VIII	Indonesia	The coastal cargo ship sank in bad weather and rough seas in the "Thousand Island" area of the Java Sea 60 nautical miles (110 km; 69 mi) north-west of Jakarta, Java, Indonesia. All 15 rescued.

=== 24 November ===
List of shipwrecks: 24 November 2021
Ship	State	Description
Unknown migrant vessel	France	A boat which was carrying migrants sank in rough waters near Calais, while travelling across the English Channel from France to Britain. At least 27 migrants died. For more information, see: November 2021 English Channel disaster

=== 28 November ===
List of shipwrecks: 28 November 2021
Ship	State	Description
Entebe Express	Indonesia	The ferry was beached by a storm on the Mamuju Regency coast, South Sulawesi, in the Makassar Strait shortly after leaving Mamuju. All 81 passengers and 18 crew made it to shore.

=== 29 November ===
List of shipwrecks: 29 November 2021
Ship	State	Description
Ayis 1	Turkey	The ro-ro passenger ferry was driven ashore in a severe storm and beat on an embankment causing her to capsize and sink at Maltepe, Istanbul, in the Sea of Marmara.
Boras	Turkey	The cargo ship broke lose from her mooring and went aground with a list at Tuzla, Istanbul, in the Sea of Marmara in a severe storm.
Umit K	Panama	The cargo ship sank at Tuzla, Istanbul, in the Sea of Marmara in a severe storm.

=== 30 November ===
List of shipwrecks: 30 November 2021
Ship	State	Description
Heiwa Maru	Togo	The cargo ship was driven ashore in a storm at Unten, Okinawa, Japan in the East China Sea.

== December ==
=== 1 December ===
List of shipwrecks: 1 December 2021
Ship	State	Description
Houei Chrystal	Panama	The cargo ship sank in a severe storm in the Sea of Japan some 250 nautical miles (460 km) south of Nakhodka, Russia. Seventeen crew were rescued, one was washed overboard and reported missing.
Narimoto Maru	Belize	The cargo ship was reportedly abandoned by her crew and capsized in the South China Sea some 160 nautical miles (300 km) east of Vũng Tàu, Vietnam.

=== 6 December ===
List of shipwrecks: 6 December 2021
Ship	State	Description
Express 54	Indonesia	The offshore supply vessel sank in Bangladesh waters southwest of Chittagong, in the Port of Payra area, due to water ingress. The ship struck bottom or an underwater object. Twelve crew were rescued.
Xing Yuan	Sierra Leone	The freighter ran aground in the downtown area of the port of Kholmsk, Sakhalin, Russia, in the Gulf of Nevelsky in the Strait of Tartary of the Sea of Japan when she dragged anchor in a storm.

=== 7 December ===
List of shipwrecks: 7 December 2021
Ship	State	Description
Bald Eagle II	United States	The fishing vessel dragged anchor and was driven aground off Southern Shores, North Carolina, in rough seas. The vessel was refloated on 15 December.

=== 10 December ===
List of shipwrecks: 10 December 2021
Ship	State	Description
Danneskjold	Cayman Islands	The sailing yacht was destroyed by fire at Hinkley Yachts Services, Newport, Rhode Island.
Drinkability	United States	The motor yacht was destroyed by fire at Hinkley Yachts Services, Newport, Rhode Island.
WIT Concrete I	Unknown	The former YOG-40-class fuel oil barge, used to store molasses and sugar, was sunk as an artificial reef 3/4 mile (1.2 km) northeast of Blackbird Caye, Belize.
Zhe Feng 566	China	The coaster was sunk in a collision with another coaster, Anquiang77 (China), in the Taiwan Strait 1.5 nautical miles (2.8 km) south-east of Nanding Island, Fujian Province China. All crew were safe.

=== 11 December ===
List of shipwrecks: 11 December 2021
Ship	State	Description
Alhambra	United States	The sailboat safely grounded just north of Cape Hatteras National Seashore's Avon Fishing Pier in Avon, North Carolina. The vessel was refloated in situ on 15 December.

=== 12 December ===
List of shipwrecks: 12 December 2021
Ship	State	Description
Tian Feng 369	China	The cargo ship sank in a storm in the Yellow Sea 30 nautical miles (56 km; 35 mi) north-east of Yantai, Shandong Province, China. Three crew were rescued, four killed, and seven reported missing.

=== 13 December ===
List of shipwrecks: 13 December 2021
Ship	State	Description
Dong Ji No. 2	Hong Kong	The offshore support platform (barge) broke her towing line on 12 December between Wangan Island and Penghu island, Penghu Islands, Taiwan, in the Taiwan Strait in rough weather. The platform drifted ashore on the eastern coast of Jiangnao Island early 13 December. She was declared a total loss.
Karin Høj	Denmark	The motor hopper barge collided with the cargo ship Scot Carrier (United Kingdom) and capsized in the Baltic Sea between Ystad, Sweden and Bornholm in foggy weather before dawn. Both of her crew were killed.

=== 14 December ===
List of shipwrecks: 14 December 2021
Ship	State	Description
Unknown fishing vessel	South Korea	A fishing vessel was sunk in a collision with the container ship Heng Yu (China) 50 nautical miles (93 km) southwest of Yeosu, South Korea, in the East China Sea. Twenty-five crew were rescued, and two were reported missing.

=== 16 December ===
List of shipwrecks: 16 December 2021
Ship	State	Description
Diamond Highway	Panama	Typhoon Rai: The car carrier, out of service since burning out in June 2019, went ashore at Lapu-Lapu City, Cebu, the Philippines. Scrapping began in place in 2023.
Jake Vincent Dos	The Philippines	Typhoon Rai: The out of service cargo ship went ashore on the western coast of Negros Island in vicinity of Bacolod, the Philippines.
LCT Citic 102	The Philippines	Typhoon Rai: The LCT cargo ship went ashore on the western coast of Negros Island in vicinity of Bacolod, the Philippines.
Mary Queen of Hope	The Philippines	Typhoon Rai: The out of service cargo ship went ashore on the western coast of Negros Island in vicinity of Bacolod, the Philippines.
Trans Asia-1	The Philippines	Typhoon Rai: The ro/pax ferry went ashore off Punta Engano, just across the bay from Cebu City, Cebu, the Philippines.

=== 17 December ===
List of shipwrecks: 17 December 2021
Ship	State	Description
Unknown cargo ship	The Philippines	Typhoon Rai: The cargo ship went ashore on the western coast of Negros Island in vicinity of Bacolod, the Philippines.

=== 20 December ===
List of shipwrecks: 20 December 2021
Ship	State	Description
Francia	Madagascar	The cargo ship sank off the northeast coast of Madagascar after springing a leak in her engine room while illegally carrying 138 passengers and crew, at least 85 fatalities.

=== 22 December ===
List of shipwrecks: 20 December 2021
Ship	State	Description
Unknown migrant vessel	Greece	A vessel smuggling Iraqi refugees from Turkey to Greece capsized and sank near Folegandros, killing at least 11 people, and leaving up to 50 people stranded in the Aegean Sea. The Greek Coastguard was able to rescue at least 12 migrants, but many remained missing and were feared dead. The wreck was one of three mass casualty events involving refugees in Greek territorial waters in one week.

=== 23 December ===
List of shipwrecks: 20 December 2021
Ship	State	Description
Tropic Breeze	Belize	The 159 feet (48 m) product tanker sank in 9,300 feet (2,800 m) of water after a collision with the megayacht Utopia IV (United States) 15 nautical miles (28 km) north northwest of New Providence Island, the Bahamas (25°17′N 77°37′W). The crew were rescued by the yacht Amara's tender.
Unknown migrant vessel	Greece	A migrant vessel crashed into rocks in the islet of Antikythera. Around 90 people were rescued by the Greek Coastguard, and 11 bodies were recovered deceased. The wreck was one of three mass casualty events involving refugees in Greek territorial waters in one week.

=== 24 December ===
List of shipwrecks: 24 December 2021
Ship	State	Description
Avijan 10	Bangladesh	The ferry was destroyed by fire in the Sugandha River in the Jhalokati District. At least 40 people were killed and about 70 were injured. She was on a voyage from Dhaka to Barguna.

=== 25 December ===
List of shipwrecks: 24 December 2021
Ship	State	Description
Unknown migrant vessel	Greece	A boat smuggling Syrian migrants from (purportedly) Turkey to Italy sank in the Aegean Sea near Paros, killing at least 16 migrants. Around 80 people were rescued. The wreck was one of three mass casualty events involving refugees in Greek territorial waters in one week.

=== Unknown date ===
List of shipwrecks: Unknown date in December 2021
Ship	State	Description
Homao	Belize	The cargo ship sprung a leak in her engine room on 24 December some 50 nautical miles (93 km) north of Keelung, Taiwan, and was abandoned. The crew was rescued. The ship was taken under tow by a salvage tug at an unknown time and towed for some time in rough weather conditions, but broke off the towing line, and drifted aground off Xianjiao Island coast, Penghu Islands, Taiwan in the Taiwan Strait. She was aground on or before 27 December.
Talayieh	Iran	While still under construction, the corvette rolled on her side in a flooded drydock at Bandar Abbas, Iran, on or before 4 December.

== Unknown date ==
List of shipwrecks: Unknown date in 2021
Ship	State	Description
Chaleur	Canada	The derelict ex-Royal Canadian Navy Bay-class minesweeper sank at its mooring in the California Delta near Stockton, California at some point during the year.
Diamond Lady	United States	The casino riverboat, abandoned in McKellar Lake, Mississippi River, near Memphis, Tennessee in 2008, sank in a freeze in 2021.
Donny S.	United States	The engineless out of service 45-foot (14 m) tugboat, sometime between November 2021 and May 2022, broke free from her mooring at a dock associated with Cole and Iron Works Construction in Baileys Harbor, Wisconsin and drifted west before grounding approximately 580 feet from shore in what was then about 4 feet of water. Still aground as of 27 September, 2026.
Two unnamed vessels	Flags unknown	Two new yachts were destroyed by fire while being carried as deck cargo on the BBC Virginia (Antigua and Barbuda) in the Taiwan Strait while being transported from their manufacturer in Taiwan to the United States sometime between 26 November when it left port and when it entered port at Kaohsiung on 11 December after calling at Dafeng, China.
