= List of former toponyms in Imathia Prefecture =

Many inhabited places in Imathia Prefecture of Greece have both Slavic and Greek forms. Some of the forms are identifiably of Greek origin, others of Slavic, yet others of Turkish or more obscure origins. Following the First World War and the Graeco-Turkish War which followed, the Greek government undertook a renaming program to place Greek names first on places with Turkophonic, and later on those with Slavophonic names.

Slavic name(s)	Current official name other Greek names	Prefecture	Geographic Coordinates	Citation	Other
Ber (Бер)	Veria (Βέροια)	Imathia	40°31′N 22°12′E	p. 6	Capital of the Prefecture
Asamati (Асамати)	Asomata (Ασώματα)	Imathia	40°29′N 22°14′E	p. 5	
Barbesh, Kutlesh (Барбеш, Кутлеш)	Vergina (Βεργίνα)	Imathia	40°29′N 22°19′E	p. 5	Barbeş, Kütleş in Turkish
Boshtani (Боштани)	Rizomata (Ριζώματα)	Imathia	40°21′N 22°13′E	p. 6	
Branjate (Брањате)	Nea Nikomidia (Νέα Νικομήδεια)	Imathia	40°35′N 22°15′E	p. 6	
Bratinishta (Братиништа)	Charadra (Χαράδρα)	Imathia	40°27′N 22°16′E	p. 6	
Valoda (Валода)	Vromopegadon (Βρομοπήγαδον)	Imathia	40°29′N 22°08′E	p. 7	
Varvara (Варвара)	Agia Varvara, formerly Varvarae (Αγία Βαρβάρα, Βαρβάραι)	Imathia	40°30′N 22°15′E	p. 7	
Vosovo (Восово)	Sfikia (Σφηκιά)	Imathia	40°23′N 22°13′E	p. 7	
Gida (Гида)	Alexandria (Αλεξάνδρεια)	Imathia	40°38′N 22°27′E	p. 8	
Golem Alabor (Голем Алабор)	Prasinada, formerly Mega Alamporon (Πρασινάδα, Μέγα Αλάμπορον)	Imathia	40°33′N 22°31′E	p. 8	
Golemo Nishel (Големо Нишел)	Niselion (Νησέλιον)	Imathia	40°35′N 22°28′E	p. 8	Büyük Aynisel in Turkish
Gorna Luzhitsa (Горна Лужица)	Ano Tripotamon (Άνω Τριπόταμον)	Imathia	40°29′N 22°11′E	p. 9	
Grisel, Gridzhali (Грисел, Гриџали)	Agkathia (Αγκαθιά)	Imathia	40°33′N 22°28′E	p. 9	
Dobra, Bogoroditsa Dobra (Добра, Богородица Добра)	Kali Panagia (Καλή Παναγία)	Imathia	40°33′N 22°11′E	p. 9	
Dolyani (Долјани)	Koumaria (Κουμαριά)	Imathia	40°31′N 22°06′E	p. 9	
Dolna Luzhitsa (Долна Лужица	Kato Tripotamos, Tripotamia (Κάτω Τριπόταμος, Τριπόταμος)	Imathia	40°30′N 22°11′E	p. 10	
Dolno Kumanich (Долно Куманич)	Kato Komnenion (Κάτω Κομνήνειον)	Imathia	40°31′N 22°10′E	p. 10	
Drachkup (Драчкуп)	Daski, formerly Dratsikon (Δάσκιον, Δρατσικόν)	Imathia	40°20′N 22°10′E	p. 10	
Gjavato (Ѓавато)	Diavatos (Διαβατός)	Imathia	40°33′N 22°17′E	p. 10	
Izvor (Извор)	Lefkopetra, formerly Izvoros (Λευκόπετρα, Ίζβορος)	Imathia	40°27′N 22°13′E	p. 11	
Javornitsa (Јаворница)	Trilofo, formerly Nea Kuklena (Τρίλοφον, Νέα Κούκλενα)	Imathia	40°34′N 22°09′E	p. 12	
Janchishta (Јанчишта)	Agios Georgios, formerly Gianissa (Άγιος Γεώργιος, Γιάνισσα)	Imathia	40°38′N 22°12′E	p. 12	
Kaljani (Калјани)	Aloros (Άλωρος)	Imathia	40°35′N 22°36′E	p. 12	
Kapsohora (Капсохора)	Kapsochorion (Καψοχώριον)	Imathia	40°37′N 22°26′E	p. 13	
Karachali (Карачали)	Mavrodendrion (Μαυροδένδριον)	Imathia	40°32′N 22°14′E	p. 13	
Kirkasij (Киркасии)	Agia Trias (Αγία Τριάς)	Imathia	40°33′N 22°26′E	p. 13	
Klidi (Клиди)	Kleidi (Κλειδίον)	Imathia	40°34′N 22°36′E	p. 14	
Kokova, Kukova (Кокова, Кукова)	Polydendro (Πολύδενδρον)	Imathia	40°25′N 22°14′E	p. 14	
Kolura (Колура)	Kouloura (Κουλούρα)	Imathia	40°33′N 22°19′E	p. 14	
Kostohor, Kostemar (Костохор, Костемар)	Koutoschori, formerly Kostochori (Κουτσοχώριον, Κωστοχώρι)	Imathia	40°32′N 22°09′E	p. 15	
Kumanich (Куманич)	Komnenion, formerly Kumanitsion (Κομνήνειον, Κουμανίτσιον)	Imathia	40°31′N 22°10′E	p. 16	
Kumshtitsa, Kum Kjoj (Кумштица, Кум Ќој)	Palaios Ammos, formerly Ammos (Παλαιός Άμμος, Άμμος)	Imathia	40°31′N 22°16′E	p. 16	
Likovishta, Likovitsa, Stara Likovishta (Ликовишта, Ликовица, Стара Ликовишта)	Palaia Lykogianni, formerly Lykogianni (Παλαιά Λυκόγιαννη, Λυκόγιαννη)	Imathia	40°36′N 22°15′E	p. 17	
Ljanover (Лјановер)	Leianovergion (Λειανοβέργιον)	Imathia	40°38′N 22°31′E	p. 17	
Malo Alabor (Мало Алабор)	Mikron Alamporon, formerly Kydonia (Μικρόν Αλάμπορον, Κυδωνέα)	Imathia	40°34′N 22°31′E	p. 18	
Marusha (Маруша)	Marousia (Μαρούσια)	Imathia	40°33′N 22°04′E	p. 19	
Melik, Menlik (Мелик, Менлик)	Meliki (Μελίκη)	Imathia	40°31′N 22°24′E	p. 19	
Mech, Mezh (Меч, Меж)	Mesi, formerly Mesti (Μέσι, Μέστι)	Imathia	40°32′N 22°16′E	p. 19	
Mikrogush (Микрогуш)	Makrochori, formerly Mikroguzi (Μακροχώριον, Μικρογούζι)	Imathia	40°34′N 22°15′E	p. 19	
Mutsala (Муцала)	Kidonochorion, formerly Mustala, Mustalion (Κυδωνοχώριον, Μουσταλά, Μουσταλίον)	Imathia	40°31′N 22°14′E	p. 20	
Neohor (Неохор)	Neochori (Νεοχώριον)	Imathia	40°39′N 22°27′E	p. 20	
Neohorion (Неохорион)	Kypseli (Κυψέλη)	Imathia	40°33′N 22°29′E	p. 20	
Nisi (Ниси)	Nissi (Νησίον)	Imathia	40°38′N 22°23′E	p. 21	
Nihor, Nihorabali (Нихор, Нихорабали)	Neochoropoulon (Νεοχωρόπουλον)	Imathia	40°36′N 22°29′E	p. 21	
Nishel, Malo Nishel, Kuchuk Ajneshel (Нишел, Мало Нишел, Ќучук Ајнешел)	Niseloudi, formerly Niseloudion (Νησελούδι, Νησελούδιον)	Imathia	40°35′N 22°29′E	p. 21	Kuchuk Ayneshel in Turkish
Nov Prodrom (Нов Продром)	Neos Prodromos (Νέος Πρόδρομος)	Imathia	40°33′N 22°24′E	p. 21	
Nova Kumshtitsa (Нова Кумштица)	Neos Ammos (Νέος Άμμος)	Imathia	40°30′N 22°16′E	p. 21	
Nova Likovishta (Нова Ликовишта)	Nea Lykogianni (Νέα Λυκόγιαννη)	Imathia	40°34′N 22°15′E	p. 22	
Novo Skilich (Ново Скилич)	Neo Skillitsio, formerly Kalochorion (Νέον Σκυλλίτσιον, Καλοχώριον)	Imathia	40°36′N 22°22′E	p. 22	
Palatich (Палатич)	Palatitsia (Παλατίτσια)	Imathia	40°29′N 22°21′E	p. 22	
Paleohor, Palihor, Malo Palihor (Палеохор, Палихор, Мало Палихор)	Palaiochora (Παλαιόχορα)	Imathia	40°35′N 22°30′E	p. 22	
Paleohori (Палеохори)	Palaichorion (Παλαιοχώριον)	Imathia	40°38′N 22°29′E	p. 22	
Pozhari, Bugarin (Пожари, Бугарин)	Kefalochori (Κεφαλοχώριον)	Imathia	40°34′N 22°22′E	p. 23	
Prodrom (Продром)	Prodromos, formerly Palaios Prodromos (Πρόδρομος, Παλαιός Πρόδρομος)	Imathia	40°32′N 22°26′E	p. 23	
Sveti Ilija (Свети Илија)	Profetes Elias (Προφήτης Ελίας)	Imathia	40°29′N 22°15′E	p. 24	
Rapsomanik (Рапсоманик)	Rapsomanikion (Ραψομανίκιον)	Imathia	40°33′N 22°21′E	p. 24	
Rahova (Рахова)	Rachi, formerly Rachia (Ράχη, Ραχιά)	Imathia	40°29′N 22°13′E	p. 24	
Reshani (Решани)	Vrysaki (Βρυσάκιον)	Imathia	40°38′N 22°24′E	p. 24	
Sadena, Sadina (Садена, Садина)	Karavi (Καράβι)	Imathia	40°32′N 22°20′E	p. 24	
Sveta Marina (Света Марина)	Agia Marina (Αγία Μαρίνα)	Imathia	40°36′N 22°13′E	p. 25	
Svinishta, Svinche, Svintsa (Свиништа, Свинче, Свинца)	Sfina (Σφήνα)	Imathia	40°33′N 22°29′E	p. 25	
Skilich (Скилич)	Palaio Skillitsio, formerly Skillitsi (Σκυλλίτσι, Παλαιόν Σκυλλίτσιον)	Imathia	40°37′N 22°20′E	p. 25	
Sporlita, Spurlita (Спорлита, Спурлита)	Elafina (Ελαφίνα)	Imathia	40°25′N 22°19′E	p. 26	
Taramon, Teramon (Тарамон, Терамон)	Tagarochorion (Ταγαροχώριον)	Imathia	40°34′N 22°13′E	p. 26	
Topljani (Топлјани)	Gerogiani (Γεωργιανοί)	Imathia	40°28′N 22°10′E	p. 27	
Trihlovo, Trihlevo (Трихлово, Трихлево)	Trilofia (Τριλοφία)	Imathia	40°33′N 22°27′E	p. 27	
Trihovishta (Триховишта)	Kampochori (Καμποχώριον)	Imathia	40°37′N 22°22′E	p. 27	
Turkohor (Туркохор)	Patris, formerly Turkochorion (Πατρίς, Τουρκοχώριον)	Imathia	40°34′N 22°11′E	p. 28	
Tsrkovjani (Црковјани)	Mikra Santa, formerly Agios Ioannis (Μικρά Σάντα, Άγίος Ιωάννης)	Imathia	40°24′N 22°09′E	p. 28	
Chatal, Neohorudi (Чатал, Неохоруди)	Dhichali (Διχάλι)	Imathia	40°36′N 22°28′E	p. 28	
Chinar Furnos (Чинар Фурнос)	Platanos, formerly Tsinaforon (Πλάτανος, Τσινάφορον)	Imathia	40°34′N 22°33′E	p. 28	
Chornovo (Чорново)	Fytia (Φυτεία)	Imathia	40°34′N 22°07′E	p. 28	
