= 2021 Baltic Sea incident =

2021 collision in the Baltic Sea

Coordinates: 55.261°N 14.257°E

- Date: 14 December 2021
- Location: Baltic Sea
- Type: ship collision
- Deaths: 1
- Injuries: unknown

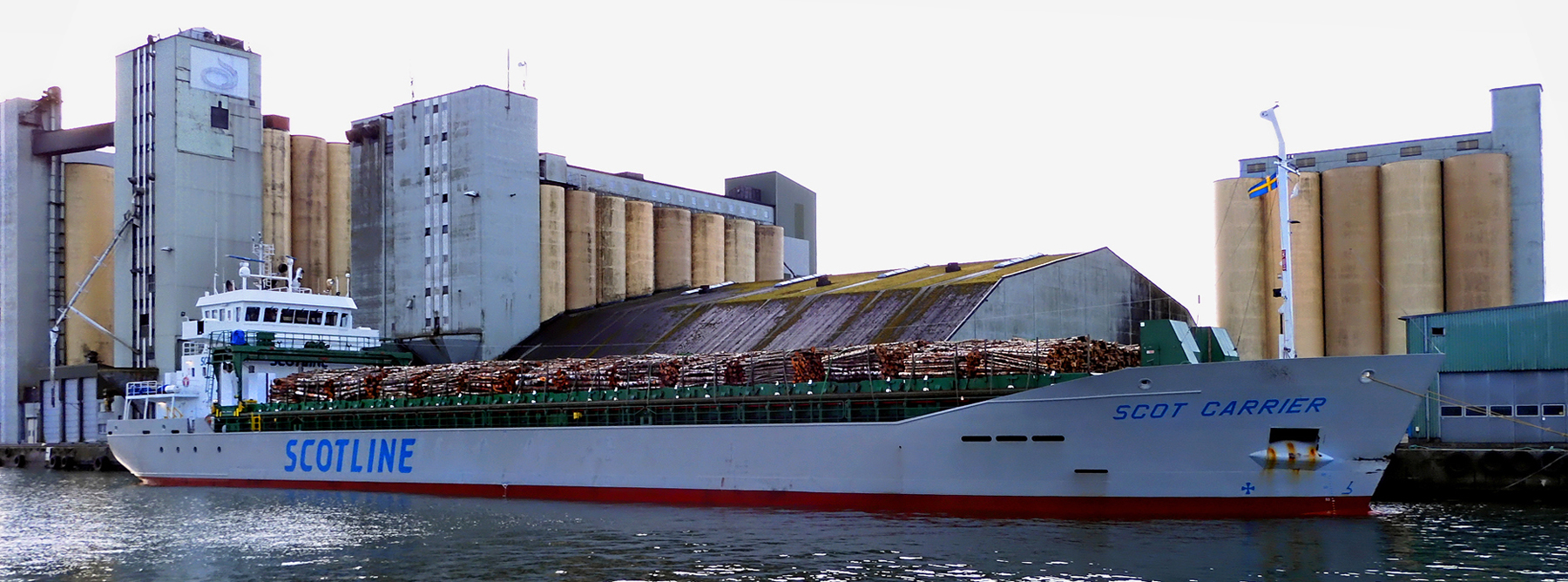
Scot Carrier in Ystad on 14 December 2021.

On 13 December 2021, one person was killed in an incident in the Baltic Sea off the coast of Sweden. Two vessels collided of which one capsized. Two people have been detained.

== Events ==
The Danish motor hopper cargo vessel MV Karin Høj collided with the British cargo ship Scot Carrier and capsized in the Baltic Sea between Ystad, Sweden, and Bornholm, Denmark. One of Karin Højs crew died and one was reported missing.

The rescue operation was extensive with about 10 boats from the Sea Rescue and the Coast Guard, also planes and helicopters participated in the search for the crew. While diving, one person was found dead on board a cabin, one person is still missing.

Two people on the Scot Carrier were arrested immediately, one was released after questioning, the other was arrested on suspicion of causing another person's death, aggravated drunken driving and aggravated negligence in maritime traffic.

== Investigation ==
The Swedish Coast Guard is investigating the incident.

The British crew member, who has been in custody in Trelleborg since 15 December 2021, had his appeal in both the Court of Appeal and the Supreme Court rejected, and will in February 2022 be handed over to Denmark for the upcoming trial.

The trial in Copenhagen District Court started on 16 June 2022. The British crew member was convicted of all charges at the city court of Copenhagen, and is set to serve 1,5 years in prison. Furthermore, they will be denied entry to Denmark for the next 12 years, and they have lost their right to pilot ships in Danish waters.

== See also ==
- List of shipwrecks in 2021
