= Scotline =

UK Shipping Company

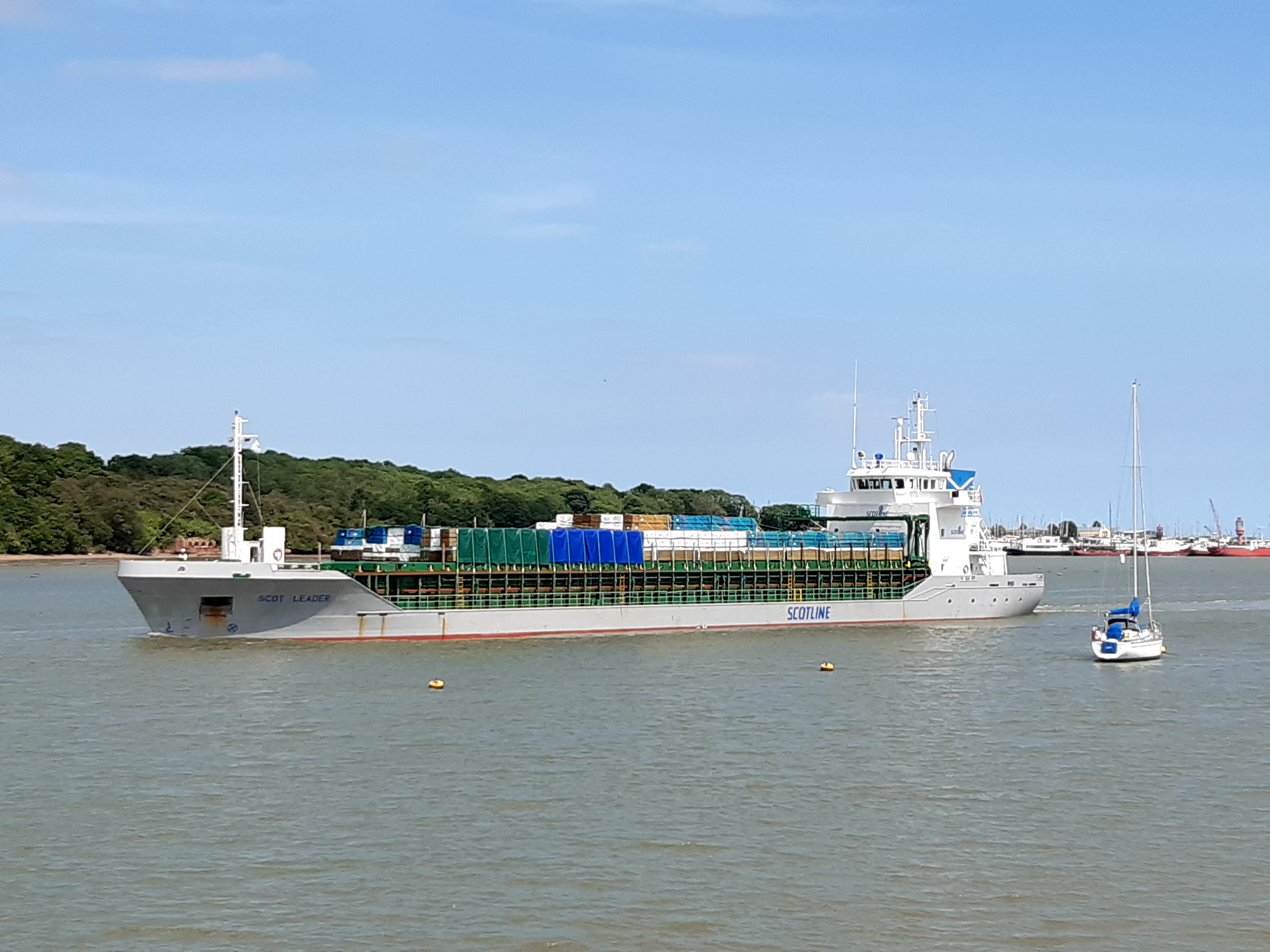
- MV Scot Leader laden on the Medway
- Industry: Shipping
- Headquarters: Rochester, United Kingdom
- Area served: Northern Europe
- Services: Cargo transportation
- Website: https://www.scotline.co.uk/

Scotline is a shipping group of companies with origins from 1979, and specializing in transporting timber, wood pulp, forestry commodities on short sea operations, whilst also providing bulk, charter and special project work. The area covered is around the British Isles, Baltic, and North-West Europe. As of December 2021 The company is operating 11 of its own vessels mostly in the 3000–5000dwt range, while also employing others on a time charter basis.

== History ==
Scotline was established in 1979, with the first cargo, a shipment of scotch spruce poles, being transported from Inverness, Scotland and Bremen, Germany. This developed into a regular route between Inverness and Varberg, Sweden.

Scotline purchased (Note: Scotline ship purchases and operations management are via associated companies, currently Intrada Ship's Management.) their first ship, the Hohebank, IMO number: 7720439 in 1977. Additional operating bases were also established at Whitstable, Kent; and Goole, Yorkshire.

In 1994 the Kent facility was changed to a 10-acre site at Rochester on the River Medway, supplemented by a further 14 acre facility nearby from 2011. The head office was relocated from central London to Ronford, in Essex. Scotline Terminal Goole, a separate independently run but associated stevedoring company, was forced to close in 2010 due to the imposition of backdated port rates.

Scotline purchased their largest ship to date, the Scot Leader, the 4500dwt from Royal Bodewes Group in 2007.

In 2017 Scotline increased their fleet of owned vessels to nine with the acquisition of the 3571dwt Scot Navigator, the decision being prompted by the success of a sister ship, the Lady Ariane, the ship being used on the Varburg–Gunness liner service.

Scotline's next ship, the Scot Carrier, was similar to the 2007 Scot Leader from Royak Bodewes, with class 1B icebreaker certification for Baltic operations. This was followed by three similar sister ships through to 2021, the later ones having 1A icebreaker classification and enclosed bridge wings.

On 13 December 2021 the Scot Carrier was in collision between Ystad and Bornholm, with the smaller Danish vessel, the 180 feet (55 m) Karin Hoej, the latter capsizing with the body of one of its crew found dead and the other missing presumed drowned.

== Fleet list ==
Scotline Fleet List
Ship	IMO	Built	DWT	Length	Timber	ICE	Notes
MV Douwent	8703139	1987	1996	80m			
MV Scot Bay	9243930	2001	3177	90m	5,000m³	Cat. II	
MV Scot Venture	9243928	2002	3262	90m	5,000m³	Cat. II	
MV Scot Mariner	9243916	2001	3313	90m	5,000m³	Cat. II	
Eastern Vanquish	9411836	2012	3577	89m	4,400m³	None	
Eastern Virage	9411824	2012	3577	89m	4,400m³	None	
MV Scot Pioneer	9331347	2006/12	3636	90m	4,700m³	1A	
MV Scot Navigator	9820348	2017/06	3700	88m	5,300m³	None	
MV Scot Leader	9404235	2007/08	4507	90m	6,300m³	1B	
MV Scot Trader	9368405	2008/04	4643	90m	5,500m³	None	
MV Scot Ranger	9851220	2021/01	4782	90m	6,700m³	1A	Replaced 1997 Vessel of same name retired 2019
MV Scot Isles	9728758	2021/07	4735	90m	6,767m³	1A	
MV Scot Carrier	9841782	2018/11	4803	90m	6,767m³	1B	
MV Scot Explorer	9841794	2019/11	4803	90m	6,767m³	1B	
