= Serge Gellé =

Malagasy politician (born 1964)

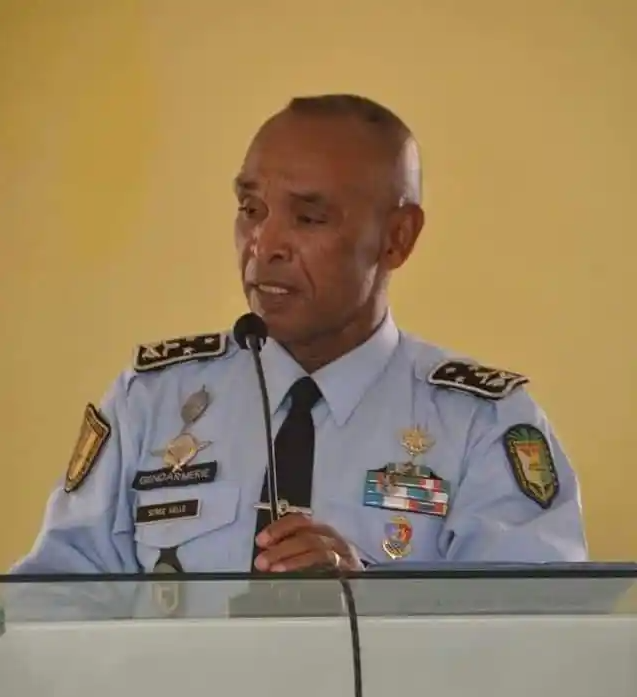

Serge Gellé (born 1964) is a Malagasy politician. He has served as Police Minister in the Ntsay government since August 2021, succeeding General Richard Ravalomanana. Prior to this he served with the police force for three decades.

== Helicopter crash ==
On 21 December 2021, Gellé, two military officers and a pilot were involved in a helicopter crash while searching for survivors of the previous day shipwreck, which killed at least 85 people. He survived by swimming for 12 hours before being rescued. One officer also survived, while the pilot and the second officer are still missing.
