= Karin Høj =

Danish barge built in 1977

Karin Høj is a Danish-registered split hopper barge built in 1977. Karin Høj was involved in a ship incident in Bornholmsgattet between Kåseberga in southern Skåne, and the Danish island of Bornholm on 13 December 2021 at 03:30. Karin Høj was hit by the British-registered cargo ship Scot Carrier, whereby Karin Høj capsized with two people on board.

The rescue operation was extensive with about 10 boats from the Sea Rescue and the Coast Guard, also planes and helicopters participated in the search for the crew. While diving, one person was found dead on board a cabin, one person is still missing. Two people on the Scot Carrier were arrested immediately, one was released after questioning, the other was arrested on suspicion of causing another person's death, gross sea drunkenness and gross negligence in maritime traffic.

The British crew member, who had been in custody in Trelleborg since 15 December 2021, had his appeal in both the Court of Appeal and the Supreme Court rejected, and was in February 2022 handed over to Denmark for the upcoming trial. The trial in Copenhagen District Court started on 16 June 2022. The British crew member was convicted of all charges at the city court of Copenhagen, and is set to serve 1,5 years in prison. Furthermore, they will be denied entry to Denmark for the next 12 years, and they have lost their right to pilot ships in Danish waters.
