= Crimson Polaris =

Cargo ship

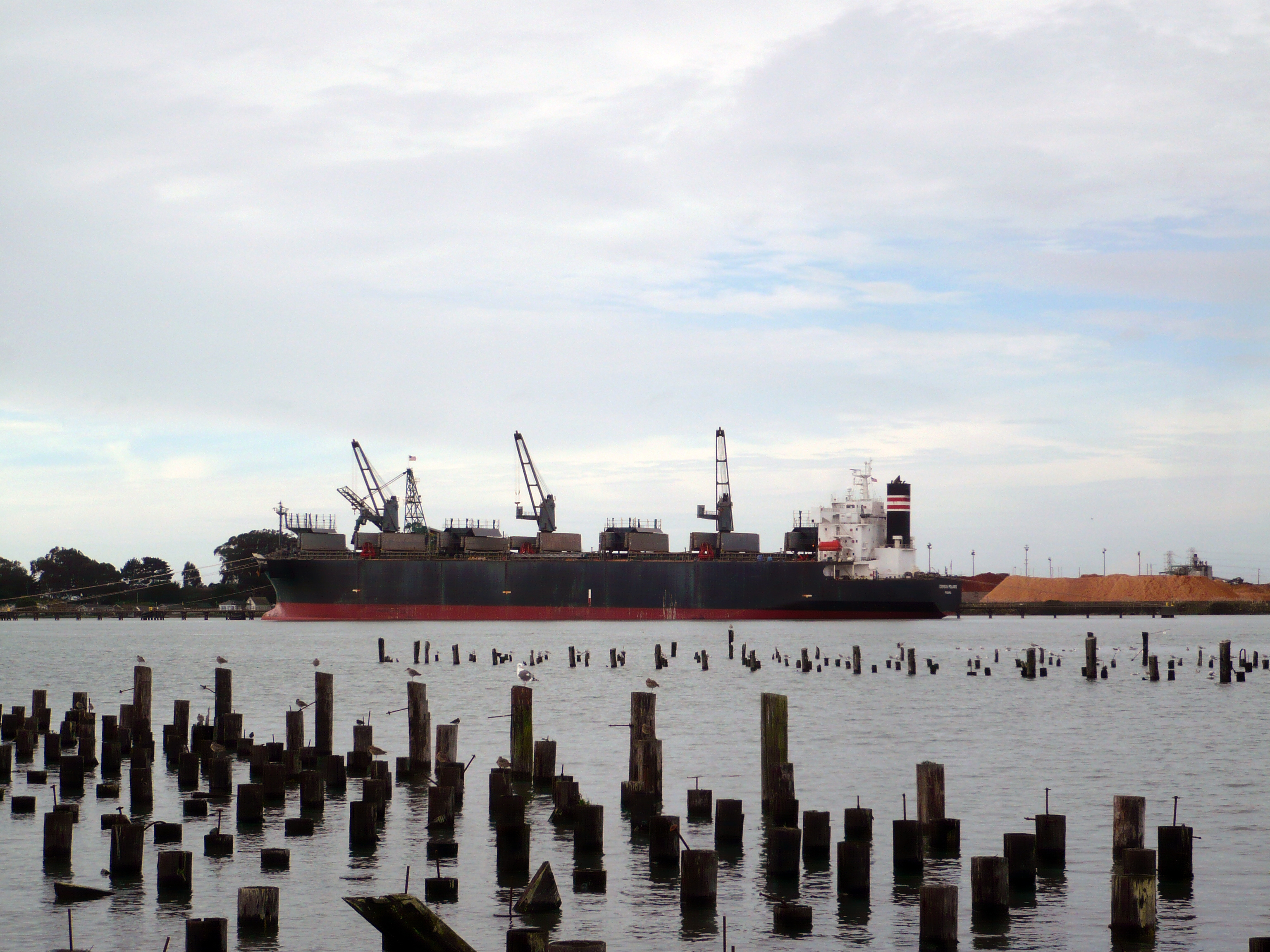
- Crimson Polaris at Eureka, California in August 2014

History
- Name: Crimson Polaris
- Owner: Doun Kisen
- Port of registry: (Panama)
- Launched: 2008
- Out of service: 2021
- Identification: IMO number: 9370783
- Fate: Ran aground and split in two off the coast of Hachinohe, Japan

General characteristics
- Tonnage: 39,910 GT; 49,549 DWT
- Length: 200 m (656 ft 2 in)
- Beam: 32 m (105 ft 0 in)
- Draught: 6.6 m (21 ft 8 in)
- Installed power: Diesel engine

Crimson Polaris was a cargo ship that split in two in August 2021.

== History ==
Crimson Polaris was a cargo ship that was completed in 2008. On 11 August 2021, it ran aground in Hachinohe, Japan nearing the end of a sailing from Thailand carrying 44,000 tonnes of wood chips. The following day it split in two between holds 5 and 6, spilling a trail of oil 24 kilometres (15 mi) long and 800 metres (0.50 mi) wide, with 1,600 tonnes of oil remaining in the ship. The stern sank while the front section was towed to port for unloading.
