= Scot Carrier =

British cargo ship

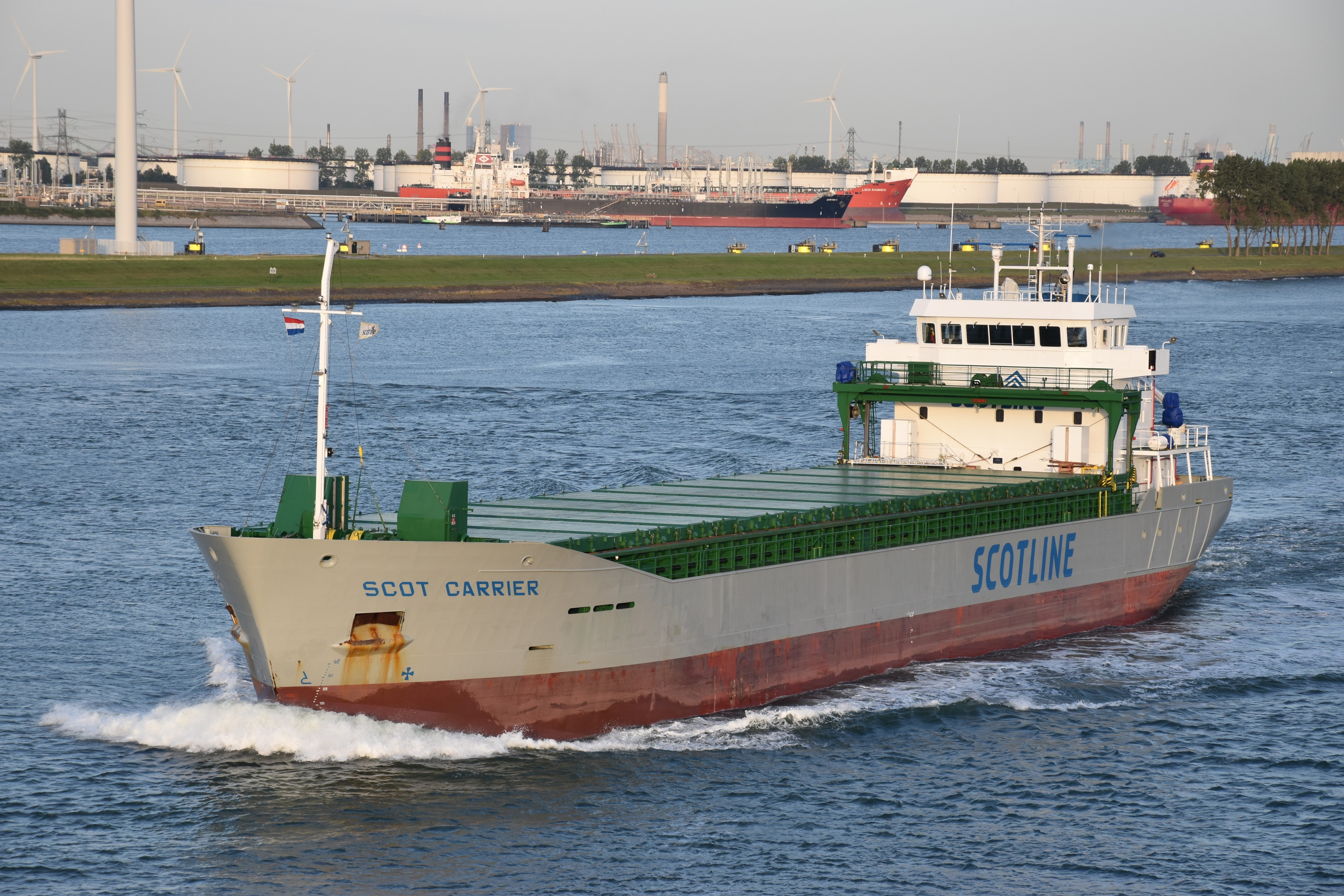
- mv Scot Carrier arriving at Rotterdam, 2019

History

- Name: Scot Carrier
- Owner: Scot Carrier Shipping Ltd., Inverness
- Operator: Scot Line Ltd.
- Port of registry: Inverness
- Route: Coastal trade Europe
- Builder: Royal Bodewes Shipyards, Hoogezand, Netherlands
- Yard number: 746
- Launched: 18 September 2018
- Completed: 4 December 2018
- Identification: IMO number: 9841782
- Status: In service

General characteristics
- Class & type: LR 100A1
- Tonnage: 3,450 GT
- Length: 89.98 m (LOA)
- Beam: 15.20 m
- Draft: 5.69 m
- Ice class: 1FB FS
- Installed power: 1,850 kW
- Propulsion: MaK 6M25C diesel engine
- Speed: 11 kn
- Capacity: 240,000 cbft (Hold capacity)
- Notes: Bodewes ECO Trader 4800

Scot Carrier is a UK-registered cargo ship, built in Hoogezand in the Netherlands. She entered service for her owners Scotline in December 2018.

== History ==
On 13 December 2021 at 03:30, Scot Carrier was involved in a ship accident between Kåseberga in southern Skåne, and the Danish island of Bornholm. Scot Carrier collided with the Danish hopper barge Karin Høj, with two people on board, which capsized. One crewmember of the capsized ship died, and the other was declared missing.

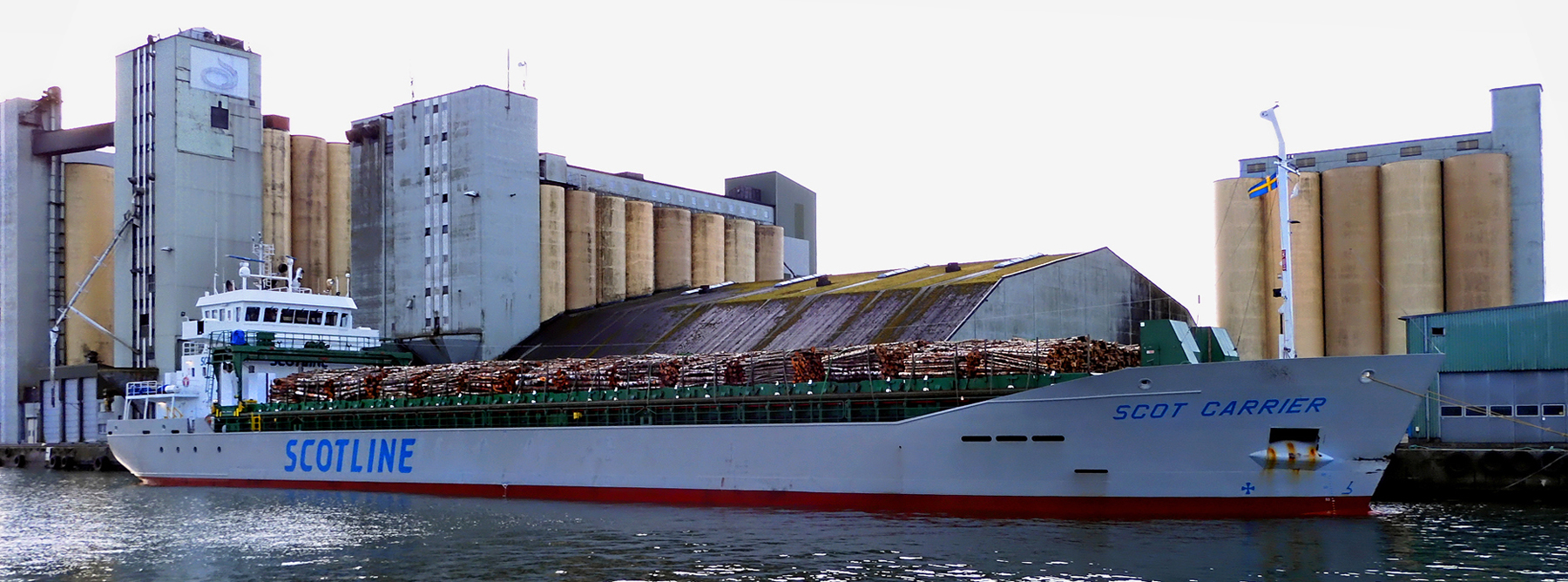
Scot Carrier in Ystad port, 14 December 2021

The rescue operation was extensive with about 10 boats from the Sea Rescue and the Coast Guard, also planes and helicopters participated in the search for the crew. While diving, one person was found dead on board a cabin, one person is still missing.

Two people on the Scot Carrier were arrested immediately, one was released after questioning, the other was arrested on suspicion of causing another person's death, aggravated drunken driving and aggravated negligence in maritime traffic.

The British crew member, who had been in custody in Trelleborg since 15 December 2021, had his appeal in both the Court of Appeal and the Supreme Court rejected, and was in February 2022 handed over to Denmark for trial. The case in Copenhagen District Court began on the 16th of June 2022. The British crew member was convicted of all charges at the city court of Copenhagen, and is set to serve 1,5 years in prison. Furthermore, they will be denied entry to Denmark for the next 12 years, and they have lost their right to pilot ships in Danish waters.

On the 18th of February 2025 The Times reported that Captain Sam Farrow had allowed his drunken second mate, Mark Wilkinson, to take control of the ship immediately before the fatal collision.

The court was told there had been a “laissez-faire” approach to safety on the vessel, managed by Intrada for Scotline, which had a workforce culture in which lookouts were not on duty to assist the person at the helm. An Intrada representative said this was a “blind spot” for the firm.

Judge Peter Henry called the incident an “accident waiting to happen” given Intrada’s lacklustre approach to safety requirements.

Wilkinson had spent 18 months in jail in Denmark.

Farrow was given an eight-month jail term, suspended for 12 months, with costs of £25,000. Intrada was convicted of failing to take all reasonable steps to secure that a ship was operated safely and was fined £180,000 with costs of £500,000.
