= MV Heng Tong 77 =

Panama-registered cargo ship

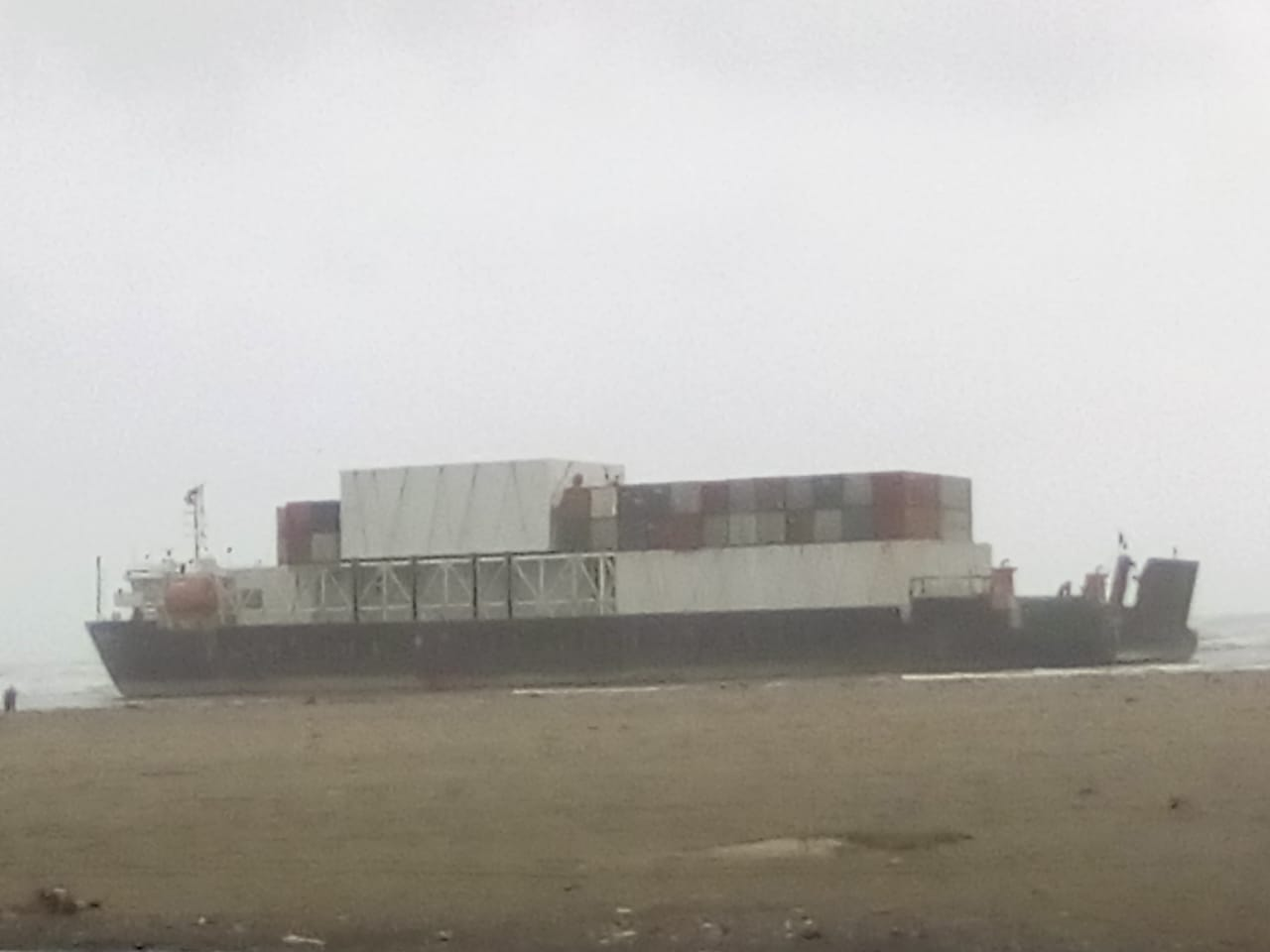

History

Panama
- Name: Heng Tong 77
- Owner: Hong Kong
- Launched: 2010
- Fate: Stranded on the beach near Karachi on 21 July 2021

General characteristics
- Type: Cargo ship
- Tonnage: 3,600 DWT
- Length: 98 m (321 ft 6 in)
- Beam: 20 m (65 ft 7 in)

The MV Heng Tong 77 was a Panama-registered cargo ship. It became stranded near Karachi in July 2021.

== Description ==
Heng Tong 77 was 98 metres (321 ft 6 in) in length and 20 metres (65 ft 7 in) wide. It was built in 2010 and had a capacity of 3,600 tons deadweight (DWT). The ship was owned by a Hong Kong–based shipping company and flagged in Panama.

== Capsizing incident ==
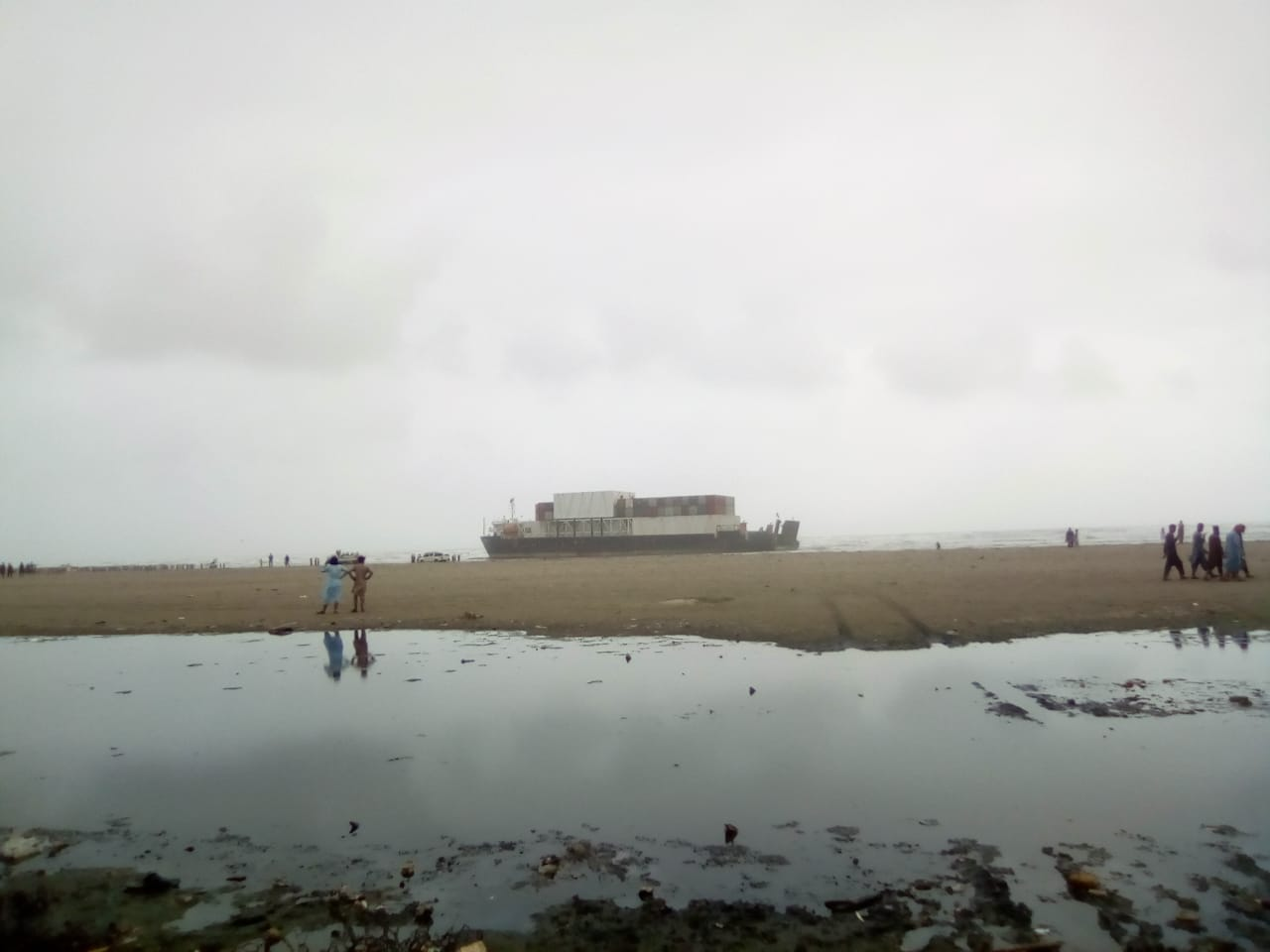
MV Heng Tong 77 stuck at Karachi Beach

On 21 July 2021, the ship lost anchor and started drifting towards shallow waters near Karachi. The ship was reportedly there for the purpose of a crew change. The ship is now detained by the Government of Pakistan due to defective conditions of the hull.

The Ministry of Maritime Affairs declared Heng Tong 77 as "unseaworthy" and detained the ship.

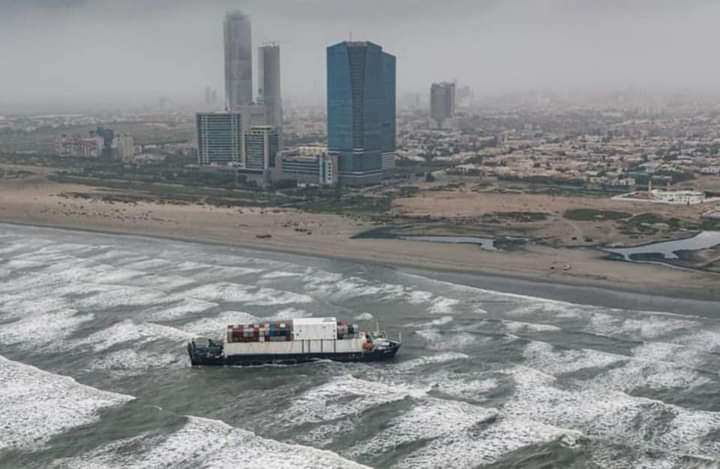
MV Heng Tong 77 stuck at Karachi Beach

On 29 July 2021, the defueling of the ship was completed, resulting in removal of 118 tonnes of bunker fuel.

On 23 August 2021, the ship became stuck again at a new part of the Seaview beach after floating 400 metres (1,300 ft) at Karachi's Seaview. The final floating was made on 7 September 2021, by the effort of the Pakistan Navy. A rescue operation was conducted jointly by teams of Pakistan Maritime Security Agency, Pakistan Navy and Karachi Port Trust.
