= 2021 Madagascar shipwreck =

Shipwreck off the coast of Madagascar

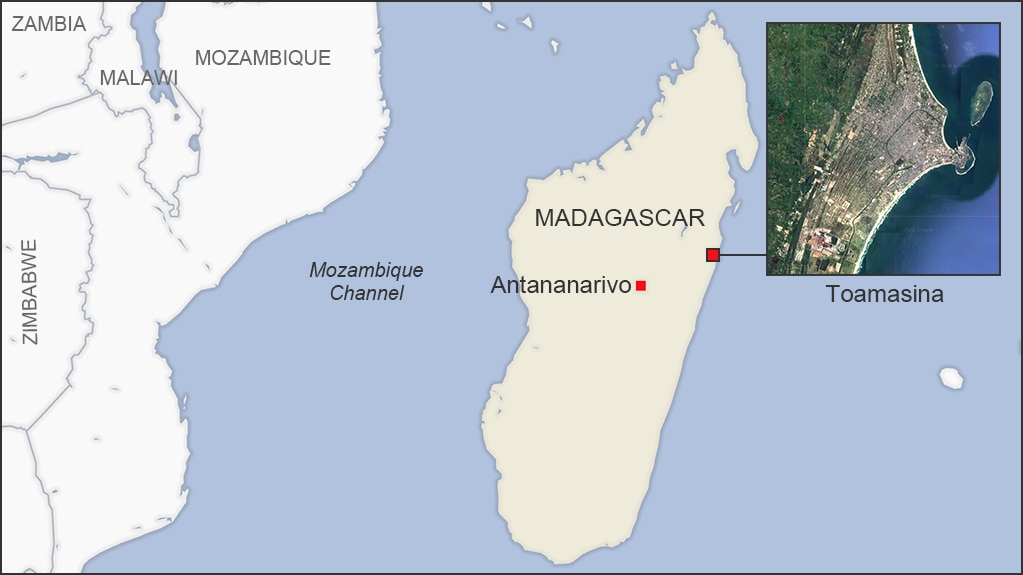
- Date: 20 December 2021
- Location: Madagascar, Indian Ocean
- Deaths: 85
- Missing: 3

On 20 December 2021, a cargo ship illegally carrying 130 passengers sank off the northeast coast of Madagascar. A hole in the hull caused the engine room to flood, leaving the vessel vulnerable to wave action. At least 85 people died during the accident.

== Wreck ==
The Francia was a 12-metre-long (39 ft) wooden vessel that was not authorized to carry passengers. The ship had illegally taken on 130 passengers for a journey from Antanambe (which is not registered as an official port) to Soanierana Ivongo, a journey of around 100 kilometres (54 nmi). Including crew, 138 people were on board. The vessel sank late on 20 December 2021 after its engine room was flooded, leaving it exposed to the action of waves. The flooding was caused by a hole in the ship's hull.

== Aftermath ==
=== Helicopter crash ===
Malagasy police minister Serge Gellé was flown to the site of the shipwreck on 21 December. His helicopter crashed and he was one of two surviving passengers (the other was Chief Warrant Officer Jimmy Laitsara). The survivors separately reached land at Mahambo. Gellé used a seat from the helicopter as a flotation device during his twelve-hour overnight swim to safety. Gellé swam to within 500 metres (1,600 ft) of the shore, but the waves prevented him from reaching land. He was spotted by a fisherman, whose canoe was too small to accommodate them both. The fisherman returned two hours later with a larger canoe and brought Gellé to dry land. The body of one of the helicopter's occupants, a police colonel, was later recovered; the pilot remains missing.

A separate helicopter carried the prime minister, Christian Ntsay, and minister of national defence, General Léon Richard Rakotonirina, to the site of the shipwreck.

=== Responses ===
A force of Malagasy gendarmes was sent to the site and an investigation into the sinking was started by the Malagasy government. Three vessels from the Madagascar Navy and maritime agency assisted in the search for survivors. By 22 December, 64 bodies had been recovered, with around 24 people missing and around 50 survivors rescued. The following day the Madagascan Maritime and Port Agency announced that the confirmed death toll had increased to 85, with three persons missing.

President Andry Rajoelina paid tribute to those who died in the shipwreck and helicopter crash. The graveyard of Soanierana-Ivongo was too small to accommodate all the bodies recovered, so some were sent to nearby villages for burial.
