= Cheyne–Stokes respiration =

Abnormal breathing pattern

- Graph showing Cheyne–Stokes respiration (bottom) and other pathological breathing patterns
- Pronunciation: /ˈtʃeɪnˈstoʊks/

Cheyne–Stokes respiration is an abnormal pattern of breathing characterized by progressively deeper, and sometimes faster, breathing followed by a gradual decrease that results in a temporary stop in breathing called an apnea. The pattern repeats, with each cycle usually taking 30 seconds to 2 minutes. It is an oscillation of ventilation between apnea and hyperpnea with a crescendo-diminuendo pattern, and is associated with changing serum partial pressures of oxygen and carbon dioxide.

Cheyne–Stokes respiration and periodic breathing are the two regions on a spectrum of severity of oscillatory tidal volume. The distinction lies in what is observed at the trough of ventilation: Cheyne–Stokes respiration involves apnea (since apnea is a prominent feature in their original description) while periodic breathing involves hypopnea (abnormally small but not absent breaths).

These phenomena can occur during wakefulness or during sleep, where they are called the central sleep apnea syndrome (CSAS).

It may be caused by damage to respiratory centers, or by physiological abnormalities in congestive heart failure. It is also seen in newborns with immature respiratory systems, in visitors new to high altitudes, and in severely ill patients approaching end-of-life.

== Pathophysiology ==
Causes may include heart failure, kidney failure, narcotic poisoning, intracranial pressure, and hypoperfusion of the brain (particularly of the respiratory center). The pathophysiology of Cheyne–Stokes breathing can be summarized as apnea leading to increased CO_{2} which causes excessive compensatory hyperventilation, in turn causing decreased CO_{2} which causes apnea, restarting the cycle.

The normal control of breathing depends on the level of carbon dioxide in the blood serum and not the amount of oxygen. When carbon dioxide levels increase the respiratory centre of the brain automatically increases the rate of respiration and the number of breaths per minute increases. This happens in order to exhale the excess amount of carbon dioxide. When the levels decrease breathing slows down. The rate has little to nothing to do with the serum level of oxygen.

In heart failure, the mechanism of the oscillation is unstable feedback in the respiratory control system. In normal respiratory control, negative feedback allows a steady level of alveolar gas concentrations to be maintained, and therefore stable tissue levels of oxygen and carbon dioxide (CO_{2}). At the steady state, the rate of production of CO_{2} equals the net rate at which it is exhaled from the body, which (assuming no CO_{2} in the ambient air) is the product of the alveolar ventilation and the end-tidal CO_{2} concentration. Because of this interrelationship, the set of possible steady states forms a hyperbola:

Alveolar ventilation = body CO_{2} production/end-tidal CO_{2} fraction.

In the figure below, this relationship is the curve falling from the top left to the bottom right. Only positions along this curve permit the body's CO_{2} production to be exactly compensated for by exhalation of CO_{2}. Meanwhile, there is another curve, shown in the figure for simplicity as a straight line from bottom left to top right, which is the body's ventilatory response to different levels of CO_{2}. Where the curves cross is the potential steady state (S).

Through respiratory control reflexes, any small transient fall in ventilation (A) leads to a corresponding small rise (A') in alveolar CO_{2} concentration which is sensed by the respiratory control system so that there is a subsequent small compensatory rise in ventilation (B) above its steady state level (S) that helps restore CO_{2} back to its steady state value. In general, transient or persistent disturbances in ventilation, CO_{2} or oxygen levels can be counteracted by the respiratory control system in this way.

However, in some pathological states, the feedback is more powerful than is necessary to simply return the system towards its steady state. Instead, ventilation overshoots and can generate a disturbance that is opposite to the original disturbance. If the secondary disturbance is larger than the original, it can provoke yet another response in the original direction that is larger yet, and so on, until very large oscillations have developed, as shown in the figure below.

The cycle of enlargement of disturbances reaches a limit when successive disturbances can grow no larger. This occurs when physiological responses no longer increase linearly in relation to the size of the stimulus. The most obvious example of this is when ventilation falls to zero: it cannot be any lower, so it stops increasing in that direction. Thus Cheyne–Stokes respiration can be maintained over periods of many minutes or hours with a repetitive pattern of apneas and hyperpneas.

The end of the linear decrease in ventilation in response to falls in CO_{2} is not, however, at apnea. It occurs when ventilation is so small that air being breathed in never reaches the alveolar space, because the inspired tidal volume is no larger than the volume of the large airways such as the trachea. In other words, the same mass of air merely moves back and forth within the trachea. Fresh air entering the mouth is not drawn far enough down the trachea for its oxygen to reach the bloodstream, and air leaving the lungs does not move far enough up the trachea to release its CO_{2} into the atmosphere. Consequently, at the nadir of periodic breathing, ventilation of the alveolar space may be effectively zero, even though some air is still moving. The easily observable counterpart of this is failure at that time point of the end-tidal gas concentrations to resemble realistic alveolar concentrations.

Many potential contributory factors have been identified by clinical observation, but unfortunately they are all interlinked and co-vary extensively. Widely accepted risk factors are hyperventilation, prolonged circulation time, and reduced blood gas buffering capacity.

They are physiologically interlinked in that (for any given patient) circulation time decreases as cardiac output increases. Likewise, for any given total body CO_{2} production rate, alveolar ventilation is inversely proportional to end-tidal CO_{2} concentration (since their mutual product must equal total body CO_{2} production rate). Chemoreflex sensitivity is closely linked to the position of the steady state, because if chemoreflex sensitivity increases (other things being equal) the steady-state ventilation will rise and the steady-state CO_{2} will fall. Because ventilation and CO_{2} are easy to observe, and because they are commonly measured clinical variables which do not require any particular experiment to be conducted in order to observe them, abnormalities in these variables are more likely to be reported in the literature. However, other variables, such as chemoreflex sensitivity can only be measured by specific experiment, and therefore abnormalities in them will not be found in routine clinical data. When measured in patients with Cheyne–Stokes respiration, hypercapnic ventilatory responsiveness may be elevated by 100% or more. When not measured, its consequences—such as a low mean Pa_{CO_{2}} and elevated mean ventilation—may sometimes appear to be the most prominent feature.

== Associated conditions ==
This abnormal pattern of breathing, in which breathing is absent for a period and then rapid for a period, can be seen in patients with heart failure, strokes, hyponatremia, traumatic brain injuries, and brain tumors. In some instances, it can occur in otherwise healthy people during sleep at high altitudes. It can occur in all forms of toxic metabolic encephalopathy. It is a symptom of carbon monoxide poisoning, along with syncope or coma. This type of respiration is different from respiratory depression, often seen after morphine administration.

Cheyne-Stokes is one of several abnormal breathing patterns potentially seen in Joubert syndrome and related disorders.

Hospices sometimes document the presence of Cheyne–Stokes breathing as a patient nears death, and report that patients able to speak after such episodes do not report any distress associated with the breathing, although it is sometimes disturbing to the family.

== Related patterns ==
Cheyne–Stokes respirations are not the same as Biot's respirations ("cluster breathing"), in which groups of similar-sized breaths are separated by periods of apnea.

They differ from Kussmaul respirations, which consist of steady, very deep breathing at a normal or increased rate without periods of apnea.

== History ==
The condition was named after John Cheyne and William Stokes, the physicians who first described it in the 19th century.

The term became widely known and used in the Soviet Union after the death of Joseph Stalin in 1953, because the Soviet press announced that the ailing Stalin had Cheyne–Stokes respiration.
