= Obstructive sleep apnea =

Upper airway closure disrupting sleep

- Other names: Obstructive sleep apnoea
- Obstructive sleep apnea: As soft tissue falls to the back of the throat, it impedes the passage of air (blue arrows) through the trachea.
- Specialty: Sleep medicine

Obstructive sleep apnea (OSA) is the most common sleep-related breathing disorder. This type of sleep apnea is characterized by recurrent episodes of complete or partial obstruction of the upper airway leading to reduced or absent breathing during sleep. These episodes are termed "apneas" with complete or near-complete cessation of breathing, or "hypopneas" when the reduction in breathing is partial. In either case, a fall in blood oxygen saturation, a sleep disruption, or both, may result. A high frequency of apneas or hypopneas during sleep may interfere with the quality of sleep, which – in combination with disturbances in blood oxygenation – is thought to contribute to negative consequences to health and quality of life. The terms obstructive sleep apnea syndrome (OSAS) or obstructive sleep apnea–hypopnea syndrome (OSAHS) may be used to refer to OSA when it is associated with symptoms during the daytime (e.g. excessive daytime sleepiness, decreased cognitive function).

Most individuals with obstructive sleep apnea are unaware of disturbances in breathing while sleeping, even after waking up. A bed partner or family member may observe a person snoring or appear to stop breathing, gasp, or choke while sleeping. People who live or sleep alone are often unaware of the condition. Symptoms may persist for years or even decades without identification. During that time, the person may become conditioned to the daytime sleepiness, headaches, and fatigue associated with significant levels of sleep disturbance. Obstructive sleep apnea has been associated with neurocognitive morbidity, and there is a link between snoring and neurocognitive disorders.

== Classification ==
In the third edition of the International Classification of Sleep Disorders (ICSD-3), obstructive sleep apnea is classified amongst the sleep-related breathing disorders and is divided in two categories, namely adult OSA and pediatric OSA. Obstructive sleep apnea is differentiated from central sleep apnea (CSA), which is characterized by episodes of reduction or cessation in breathing attributable to decreased effort, rather than upper airway obstruction. The respiratory effort must then be assessed in order to correctly classify the apnea as obstructive given the specificity of the diaphragmatic activity in this condition: the inspiratory effort is continued or increased through the entire episode of absent airflow.

When hypopneas are present alongside apneas, the term obstructive sleep apnea-hypopnea is used. If it is associated with daytime sleepiness and other daytime symptoms, it is known as obstructive sleep apnea-hypopnea syndrome. To be categorized as obstructive, the hypopnea must meet one or more of the following symptoms: (1) snoring during the event, (2) increased oronasal flow flattening, or (3) thoraco-abdominal paradoxical respiration during the event. If none of them are present during the event, then it is categorized as central hypopnea.

== Signs and symptoms ==
Common symptoms of obstructive sleep disorder syndrome include unexplained daytime sleepiness, restless sleep, frequent awakenings and loud snoring (with periods of silence followed by gasps). Less common symptoms are morning headaches; insomnia; trouble concentrating; mood changes such as irritability, anxiety, and depression; bruxism (teeth grinding), forgetfulness; increased heart rate or blood pressure; erectile dysfunction, unexplained weight gain; increased urinary frequency or nocturia; frequent heartburn or gastroesophageal reflux; and heavy night sweats.

Many people experience episodes of OSA transiently, for only a short period. This can be the result of an upper respiratory infection that causes nasal congestion, swelling of the throat, or tonsillitis that temporarily produces very enlarged tonsils. The Epstein-Barr virus, for example, is known to be able to increase the size of lymphoid tissue dramatically during acute infection, and OSA is fairly common in acute cases of severe infectious mononucleosis. Temporary spells of OSA syndrome may also occur in people who are under the influence of a drug (such as alcohol) that may relax their body tone excessively and interfere with normal arousal from sleep mechanisms.

=== Adults ===
The special symptom of OSA syndrome in adults is excessive daytime sleepiness. Typically, an adult or adolescent with severe long-standing OSA will fall asleep for very brief periods in the course of usual daytime activities if allowed to sit or rest. This behavior may be quite dramatic, sometimes occurring during conversations with others at social gatherings.

The hypoxia (absence of oxygen supply) related to OSA may cause changes in the neurons of the hippocampus and the right frontal cortex. Neuroimaging research revealed evidence of hippocampal atrophy in people with OSA. They found that OSA can cause problems in mentally manipulating nonverbal information, executive functions, and working memory. OSA may also be associated with an increased risk of a person developing Alzheimer's disease.

Obesity is a major risk factor for OSA. In the severely obese, the risk for sleep apnea can be between 55 and 90%. However between 20 and 25% of patients with sleep apnea are not overweight. What is often unrecognized in primary care is that it is crucial to identify these patients because they are four times more likely to develop hypertension than obese individuals without OSA. And non-obese patients are at a higher risk for early atherosclerosis. In fact, approximately 2.7 times more than obese patients without OSA. This risk increases as the severity of the syndrome worsens. Factors in this population may include inherited anatomical features, instability of ventilatory control, neuromuscular inefficiency of the dilator muscles of the upper airways, or a lower threshold for awakening in response to respiratory stimuli.

Diagnosis of obstructive sleep apnea is significantly more common among people in relationships, who are alerted to their condition by being informed by their sleeping partner, since individuals with obstructive sleep apnea are often unaware of the condition. There is a stigma associated with loud snoring. It is not considered a feminine trait. Consequently, females are less likely to be told by their partners that they snore, or to admit it to themselves or doctors. Furthermore, CPAP (continuous positive airway pressure) machines are also perceived negatively by females. They are less likely to be utilized to their full extent in this group.

=== Children ===
Although this so-called "hypersomnolence" (excessive sleepiness) may also occur in children, it is not at all typical of young children with sleep apnea. Toddlers and young children with severe OSA instead ordinarily behave as if "over-tired" or "hyperactive"; and usually appear to have behavioral problems like irritability and an attention deficit.

Adults and children with very severe OSA also differ in typical bodily habitus. Adults are generally heavy, with particularly short and heavy necks. Young children, on the other hand, are generally not only thin but may have "failure to thrive", where growth is reduced. Poor growth occurs for two reasons: the work of breathing is intense enough that calories are burned at high rates even at rest, and the nose and throat are so obstructed that eating is both tasteless and physically uncomfortable. OSA in children, unlike adults, is often caused by obstructive tonsils and adenoids and may sometimes be cured with tonsillectomy and adenoidectomy.

This problem can also be caused by excessive weight in children. In this case, the symptoms are similar to those adults experience, such as restlessness and exhaustion. If adenotonsillar hypertrophy remains the most common cause of OSA in children, obesity can also play a role in the pathophysiology of upper airway obstruction during sleep which can lead to OSA, making obese children more likely to develop the condition. The recent epidemic increase of obesity prevalence has thus contributed to changes in the prevalence and in the characteristics of pediatric OSA, the severity of OSA is proportional to the degree of obesity.

Obesity leads to narrowing of the upper airway structure due to fatty infiltration and fat deposits in the anterior neck region and cervical structures. Alongside with the additional weight loading on the respiratory system, it increases the risk of pharyngeal collapsibility while reducing the intrathoracic volume and diaphragm excursion. Moreover, excessive daytime sleepiness resulting from sleep fragmentation can decrease physical activity and thus lead to weight gain (by sedentary habits or increased food intake to overcome somnolence). The obesity-related obstruction of upper airway structure has led some authors to distinguish between two types of OSA in children: type I is associated with marked lymphadenoid hypertrophy without obesity and type II is first associated with obesity and with milder upper airway lymphadenoid hyperplasia. The two types of OSA in children can result in different morbidities and consequences. Studies have shown that weight loss in obese adolescents can reduce sleep apnea and thus the symptoms of OSA.

== Diagnosis ==
The diagnosis of OSA syndrome is made when the patient has recurrent episodes of partial or complete collapse of the upper airway during sleep, resulting in apneas or hypopneas, respectively. Criteria defining an apnea or a hypopnea vary. The American Academy of Sleep Medicine (AASM) defines an apnea episode as a reduction in airflow of ≥ 90% lasting at least 10 seconds. A hypopnea is defined as a reduction in airflow of ≥ 30% lasting at least 10 seconds and associated with a ≥ 4% decrease in pulse oxygenation, or as a ≥ 30% reduction in airflow lasting at least 10 seconds and associated either with a ≥ 3% decrease in pulse oxygenation or with an arousal.

To define the severity of the condition, the Apnea-Hypopnea Index (AHI) or the Respiratory Disturbance Index (RDI) is used. While the AHI measures the mean number of apneas and hypopneas per hour of sleep, the RDI adds to this measure the respiratory effort-related arousals (RERAs). The OSA syndrome is thus diagnosed if the AHI is > 5 episodes per hour and results in daytime sleepiness and fatigue or when the RDI is ≥ 15 independently of the symptoms. Daytime sleepiness may be classified as mild, moderate, or severe depending on its impact on social life. Daytime sleepiness can be assessed using the Epworth Sleepiness Scale (ESS), a self-reported questionnaire on the propensity to fall asleep or doze off during the day. Screening tools for OSA itself comprise the STOP questionnaire, the Berlin questionnaire and the STOP-BANG questionnaire which has been reported as being a powerful tool to detect OSA.

=== Polysomnography ===
Rating	AHI (adult)	AHI (pediatrics)
Normal	< 5	<1
Mild	≥5, <15	≥1, <5
Moderate	≥15, <30	≥5, <10
Severe	≥ 30	≥10

Nighttime in-laboratory Level 1 polysomnography (PSG) is the gold-standard diagnostic test. Patients are monitored with EEG leads, pulse oximetry, temperature or pressure sensors to detect nasal and oral airflow, respiratory impedance plethysmography or similar resistance belts around the chest and abdomen to detect motion, an ECG lead, and EMG sensors to detect muscle contraction in the chin, chest, and legs.

An "event" can be either an apnea, characterized by complete cessation of airflow for at least 10 seconds, or a hypopnea in which airflow decreases by 50 percent for 10 seconds or decreases by 30 percent if there is an associated decrease in the oxygen saturation or an arousal from sleep. To grade the severity of sleep apnea, the number of events per hour is reported as the apnea-hypopnea index (AHI). For adults, an AHI of less than 5 is considered normal, an AHI of [5–15) is mild, [15–30) is moderate, and ≥30 events per hour characterizes severe sleep apnea. For pediatrics, an AHI of less than 1 is considered normal, an AHI of [1–5) is mild, [5–10) is moderate, and ≥10 events per hour characterizes severe sleep apnea.

=== Home sleep test (HST) / home sleep apnea test (HSAT) ===
Sleep apnea can also be diagnosed using an in-home testing kit. The main advantage is that these record in the usual sleep environment and thus are more representative of their natural sleep than staying overnight at a lab. Home sleep testing is more accessible and less expensive than polysomnography due to long waiting periods for in-lab tests.

=== Home oximetry and peripheral arterial tone measurement ===
Home oximetry (a non-invasive method of monitoring blood oxygenation) used in concert with Peripheral Arterial Tone (PAT) technology has been approved by the FDA at-home sleep apnea diagnosis since November 2001 when Itamar Medical obtained 510(k) clearance for the Watchpat-100. Although PAT-based at-home sleep tests are not considered as accurate as polysomnography-based tests, their AHI or AHI-equivalent measurements are considered sufficient for coverage purposes in the United States by Medicare and private health insurance companies.

=== Criteria ===
According to the International Classification of Sleep Disorders, there are 4 types of criteria. The first one concerns sleep – excessive sleepiness, non-restorative sleep, fatigue, or insomnia. The second and third criteria are about respiration – waking with breath holding, gasping, or choking; snoring, breathing interruptions, or both during sleep. The last criterion revolved around medical issues such as hypertension, coronary artery disease, stroke, heart failure, atrial fibrillation, type 2 diabetes mellitus, mood disorder, or cognitive impairment. Two levels of severity are distinguished: the first is diagnosed by polysomnography or a home sleep apnea test demonstrating five or more predominantly obstructive respiratory events per hour of sleep; 15 or more events diagnose the higher level of severity. If the events occur fewer than 5 times per hour, no obstructive sleep apnea is diagnosed.

A considerable night-to-night variability further complicates the diagnosis of OSA. In unclear cases, multiple testing might be required to achieve an accurate diagnosis.

== Pathophysiology ==
The transition from wakefulness to sleep (REM sleep or NREM sleep) is associated with a reduction in upper-airway muscle tone. During REM sleep, the muscle tone of the throat and neck, as well as that of the vast majority of skeletal muscles, is almost completely relaxed. This allows the tongue and soft palate/oropharynx to relax, reducing airway patency and potentially impeding or completely obstructing air flow into the lungs during inspiration, resulting in reduced respiratory ventilation. If reductions in ventilation are associated with sufficiently low blood-oxygen levels or with sufficiently high breathing efforts against an obstructed airway, neurological mechanisms may trigger a sudden interruption of sleep, called a neurological arousal. This arousal can cause an individual to gasp for air and awaken. These arousals rarely result in complete awakening but can have a significant negative effect on the restorative quality of sleep. In significant cases of OSA, one consequence is sleep deprivation resulting from the repetitive disruption and recovery of sleep activity. This sleep interruption in Stage 3 NREM sleep (also called slow-wave sleep) and in REM sleep can interfere with normal growth patterns, healing, and immune response, especially in children and young adults.

The fundamental cause of OSA is a blocked upper airway, usually behind the tongue and epiglottis, whereby the otherwise patent airway, in an erect, awake patient, collapses when the patient lies on his or her back and loses muscle tone upon entering deep sleep.

At the beginning of sleep, a patient is in light sleep with no loss of tone in the throat muscles. Airflow is laminar and soundless. As the upper airway collapses, the obstruction becomes increasingly apparent with the initiation of noisy breathing as air turbulence increases, followed by gradually louder snoring as a Venturi effect forms through the ever-narrowing air passage. The patient's blood-oxygen saturation gradually falls until sleep noise stops, signifying total airway obstruction. This may last for several minutes.

Eventually, the patient must at least partially awaken from deep sleep into light sleep, automatically regaining general muscle tone. This switch from deep to light to deep sleep can be recorded using ECT monitors. In light sleep, muscle tone is near normal, the airway spontaneously opens, normal noiseless breathing resumes, and blood oxygen saturation rises. Eventually, the patient reenters deep sleep, upper airway tone is lost, the patient enters the various levels of noisy breathing, and airway blockage returns.

The cycle of muscle tone loss and restoration, coinciding with periods of deep and light sleep, repeats throughout the patient's sleep period. The number of apnoea and hypopnoea episodes during any given hour is counted and given a score. If a patient has an average of five or more episodes per hour, mild OSA may be confirmed. An average of 30 or more episodes per hour indicates severe OSA.

=== Pathophysiological models ===
Clinical professionals continue to debate the causes of spontaneous upper airway blockage. The areas of thought are divided mostly into three medical groups.

Some pulmonologists and neurologists believe the risk factors to be:

- Advanced age, although OSA occurs in neonates, as with Pierre Robin syndrome, and in all age groups of people.
- Brain injury (temporary or permanent), although this does not account for the 99% of OSA patients who have normal brains and normal lives.
- Decreased muscle tone caused by drugs or alcohol, or caused by neurological disorders. This also would not account for the majority of people with OSA.
- Long-term snoring, which is postulated to potentially induce local nerve lesions in the soft tissues of the pharynx. Snoring may produce traumatic vibrations that may give rise to nerve injuries in the upper airway muscles, further contributing to OSA.
- Increased soft tissue around the airway, often resulting from obesity, though not seen in all patients with OSA.

Some otorhinolaryngologists believe the risk factors to be structural features that give rise to a narrowed airway, such as enlarged tonsils, an enlarged posterior tongue, or fat deposits in the neck. Further factors leading to OSA can be impaired nasal breathing, floppy soft palate, or a collapsible epiglottis.

Some oral and maxillofacial surgeons believe the risk factors to be several primary forms of mandibular hypoplasia, which offer a primary anatomical basis to the development of OSA through glossoptosis. Some maxillofacial surgeons who offer orthognathic surgery for treatment of OSA believe that their treatments offer superior guarantees of a cure.

== Risk factors ==
=== Obesity ===
It is well known that children, adolescents, or adults with OSA are often obese. People with obesity show an increase in neck fat tissue, which potentiates respiratory obstruction during sleep.

However, people of all ages and sexes with normal body mass indices (BMIs) can also demonstrate OSA – and these people do not have significant measures of subdermal or intra-neck fat as shown on DEXA scans. It is speculated that they may have increased muscle mass or a tendency toward decreased muscle tone, potentiating airway collapse during sleep.

However, loss of muscle tone is a key feature of deep sleep, and whilst obesity seems a common association, it is not an invariable state of OSA.

Sleeping supine (on one's back) is also represented as a risk factor for OSA. Gravity and loss of tongue and throat tone as a person enters deep sleep are clear factors contributing to OSA development. But this explanation is also confounded by the presence of neck obesity.

The use of CPAP primarily expands a collapsed upper airway, allowing for nasal breathing. A positive response to CPAP confirms that airway collapse is the cause of OSA.

Throat lesions, particularly enlarged tonsils, are well recognized as aggravators of OSA, and removal may provide full, partial, or semi-permanent relief from OSA, which also indicates that enlarged tonsils may play a role in the pathogenesis of OSA.

=== Age ===
Old age is often accompanied by muscular and neurological loss of muscle tone in the upper airway. Decreased muscle tone is also temporarily caused by chemical depressants; alcoholic drinks and sedative medications are the most common. Permanent premature muscular tonal loss in the upper airway may be precipitated by traumatic brain injury, neuromuscular disorders, or poor adherence to chemical and or speech therapy treatments.

=== Muscle tone ===
Individuals with decreased muscle tone, increased soft tissue around the airway, and structural features that narrow the airway are at high risk for OSA. Men, whose anatomy is typified by increased mass in the torso and neck, are at increased risk of developing sleep apnea, especially in middle age and later. Typically, women experience this condition less frequently and to a lesser degree than do men, owing partially to physiology, but possibly also to differential levels of progesterone. Prevalence in post-menopausal women approaches that of men in the same age range. Women are at greater risk for developing OSA during pregnancy.

=== Medication and lifestyle ===
Lifestyle factors such as smoking may also increase the chances of developing OSA, as the chemical irritants in smoke tend to inflame the soft tissue of the upper airway and promote fluid retention, both of which can narrow the upper airway. Cigarettes may also have an impact due to a decline in blood nicotine levels, which alters sleep stability. Smokers thus show a higher risk of developing OSA, but the effect of cigarettes on increased OSA is reversible with the cessation of smoking. Children exposed to cigarette smoke may also develop OSA, as the lymphoid tissue will proliferate excessively in contact with the irritants. An individual may also experience or exacerbate OSA with the consumption of alcohol, sedatives, or any other medication that increases sleepiness as most of these drugs are also muscle relaxants. Allergic rhinitis and asthma have also been shown to be implicated in the increased prevalence of adenotonsillar hypertrophy and OSA.

=== Genetic ===
OSA also appears to have a genetic component; those with a family history of it are more likely to develop it themselves. This could be the result of both direct genetic contributions to OSA susceptibility. Or it could be from indirect contributions via 'intermediate' phenotypes such as obesity, craniofacial structure, neurological control of upper airway muscles, and of sleep and circadian rhythm sleep problems.

Several genes connected with sleep apnea have been identified, including DLEU1, DLEU7 CTSF, MSRB3, FTO, and TRIM66.

=== Craniofacial syndromes ===
Of substantial recent interest is the idea that there is a general human tendency towards developing short lower jaws (neoteny) is a major cause of OSA through a combined condition called glossoptosis. The posterior "normal" tongue is displaced backwards by a smaller "abnormal" anterior tongue and lower jaw. In much the same way, a narrow upper jaw will also contribute to OSA due to its relation to airway volume. A narrower upper jaw results in narrower nasal passages and a narrower throat; this also appears to be why so many OSA patients experience nasal congestion, especially while lying down.

Maxillofacial surgeons see many effects of small lower jaws, including crowded teeth, malocclusions, as well as OSA – all of which are treatable by surgical operations that increase and normalise jaw size. Operations such as custom BIMAX, GenioPaully, and IMDO (in adolescence) offer a valid medical option that replaces all traditional forms of OSA treatment – including CPAP, Mandibular Advancement Splints, tonsillectomy, and UPPP. There are patterns of unusual facial features that occur in recognizable syndromes. Some of these craniofacial syndromes are genetic, and others are from unknown causes. In many craniofacial syndromes, unusual features involve the nose, mouth, and jaw, or resting muscle tone, and put the individual at risk for OSA.

Down syndrome is one such syndrome. In this chromosomal abnormality, several features combine to make the presence of obstructive sleep apnea more likely. The specific features of Down syndrome that predispose to obstructive sleep apnea include relatively low muscle tone, a narrow nasopharynx, and a large tongue. Obesity and enlarged tonsils and adenoids, conditions that occur commonly in the western population, are much more likely to be obstructive in a person with these features than without them. Obstructive sleep apnea occurs even more frequently in people with Down syndrome than in the general population. A little over 50% of all people with Down syndrome experience obstructive sleep apnea. Some physicians advocate routine testing of this group.

In other craniofacial syndromes, the abnormal feature may improve the airway, but its correction may put the person at risk for obstructive sleep apnea after surgery when it is modified. Cleft palate syndromes are such an example. During the newborn period, all humans are obligate nasal breathers. The palate is both the roof of the mouth and the floor of the nose. Having an open palate may make feeding difficult, but generally, it does not interfere with breathing; if the nose is very obstructed, then an open palate may relieve breathing. There are several clefting syndromes in which the open palate is not the only abnormal feature; additionally, there is a narrow nasal passage, which may not be obvious. In such individuals, closure of the cleft palate – whether by surgery or a temporary oral appliance – can cause the onset of obstruction.

Skeletal advancement to physically increase the pharyngeal airspace is often an option for craniofacial patients with upper airway obstruction and small lower jaws (mandibles). These syndromes include Treacher Collins syndrome and Pierre Robin sequence. Mandibular advancement surgery is one of the modifications needed to improve the airway; others may include reduction of the tongue, tonsillectomy, or modified uvulopalatoplasty.

=== Post-operative complication ===
OSA can also occur as a serious post-operative complication that seems to be most frequently associated with pharyngeal flap surgery as compared to other procedures for the treatment of velopharyngeal inadequacy (VPI). In OSA, recurrent interruptions of respiration during sleep are associated with temporary airway obstruction. Following pharyngeal flap surgery, depending on size and position, the flap itself may have an "obturator" or obstructive effect within the pharynx during sleep, blocking ports of airflow and hindering effective respiration. There have been documented instances of severe airway obstruction, and reports of post-operative OSA continues to increase as healthcare professionals (i.e. physicians, speech language pathologists) become more educated about this possible dangerous condition. Subsequently, in clinical practice, concerns of OSA have matched or exceeded interest in speech outcomes following pharyngeal flap surgery.

The surgical treatment for velopalatal insufficiency may cause obstructive sleep apnea syndrome. When velopalatal insufficiency is present, air leaks into the nasopharynx even when the soft palate should close off the nose. A simple test for this condition can be made by placing a tiny mirror on the nose and asking the subject to say "P". This p sound, a plosive, is normally produced with the nasal airway closed off – all air comes out of the pursed lips, none from the nose. If it is impossible to say the sound without fogging a nasal mirror, there is an air leak, reasonable evidence of poor palatal closure. Speech is often unclear due to the inability to pronounce certain sounds. One of the surgical treatments for velopalatal insufficiency involves tailoring the tissue from the back of the throat and using it to purposefully cause partial obstruction of the opening of the nasopharynx. This may actually cause OSA syndrome in susceptible individuals, particularly in the days following surgery, when swelling occurs (see below: Special Situation: Anesthesia and surgery).

Finally, patients with OSA are at an increased risk of many perioperative complications when they are present for surgery, even if the planned procedure is not on the head and neck. Guidelines to reduce the risk of perioperative complications have been published.

== Consequences ==
There are 3 levels of consequences: physiologic, intermediate, and clinical. The physiologic consequences include hypoxia, sleep fragmentation, autonomic nervous system dysregulation, or hyperoxia. The intermediate results regroup inflammation, pulmonary vasoconstriction, general metabolic dysfunction, oxidation of proteins and lipids, or increased adiposity. The clinical repercussions include pulmonary hypertension, accidents, obesity, diabetes, different heart diseases, and hypertension.

=== In children ===
Obstructive sleep apnea is the most common Sleep-Disordered Breathing (SDB) and affects up to 11% of children born at term – it is even more common (3 to 6 times more) in children born pre-term. As a SDB, OSA in children can lead to several adverse consequences, also in the long-term with consequences lasting into adulthood. The implications of OSA in children are complex and cover a large scope of consequences: when it is left untreated, OSA can lead to morbidity affecting many different domains of life (organs, body systems, behavioral disturbance, depression, decreased quality of life, etc.). Therefore, nocturnal symptoms indicating the presence of OSA (e.g. snoring, gasping, restless sleep and excessive energy used to breathe during sleep) are associated with daytime symptoms such as concentration and learning difficulties and irritability, neurocognitive development impairment, decreased school performance and behavioral difficulties. For example, SDB such as OSA contributes to hyperactive behavior that can lead to the diagnosis and treatment of attention deficit hyperactivity disorder (ADHD). However, once the SDB is treated, the hyperactive behavior can improve, and the treatment can be stopped. Obesity also has an impact on the consequences of OSA and lead to different manifestations or severity. Studies have shown that, contrary to adults, children with obstructive sleep-disordered breathing can maintain cerebral oxygenation. However, the condition still has effects on the brain and can lead to adverse neurocognitive and behavioral sequelae. It is particularly concerning as those consequences happen while the brain is still developing. The degree to which the sleep is disturbed and fragmented has been significantly linked to the severity of the consequences, the latter having the possibility to decrease once the sleep is improved. It is more the disruption of sleep processes than the total amount of sleep the child experience that generates the adverse consequences on the child's daytime functioning; it contributes to the hyperactivity for example.

Children with OSA may experience learning and memory deficits, and OSA has been linked to lowered childhood IQ scores. Untreated OSA may prevent children from reaching their height potential.

==== Neurocognitive and behavioral consequences ====
Nocturnal sleep fragmentation has been linked to neurocognitive impairments, therefore, the identification of SDB such as OSA is crucial in children, those impairments having the possibility to be reversible with the appropriate treatment for the sleep disorder. The neurocognitive and behavioral dysfunctions commonly present in children with OSA include the following: hyperactivity, impulsivity, aggressive behaviors, low social and communication abilities and reduced adaptive skills.

Children with OSA commonly show cognitive deficits, resulting in attention and concentration difficulties, as well as lower academic performance and IQ. Poor academic performances have been linked to OSA and suggested to result from cortical and sympathetic arousals and hypoxemia which affects memory consolidation. A study with Indian children affected by OSA has shown poor school grades, including mathematics, science, language, and physical education. This study allowed us to see the overall impact of OSA on learning abilities associated with language or numeracy skills and physical development. It has been suggested that the deficits in academic performance related to OSA could be mediated through reduced executive functions or language skills, those domains contributing highly to learning abilities and behavior. The deficits in school performance can nevertheless be improved if adenotonsillectomy is performed on children to treat the OSA. It is thus crucial to identify the OSA for children with school difficulties; many cases remain unnoticed.

Studies have shown that learning skills and behaviors can be improved if the OSA is treated, the neurocognitive and behavioral deficits are thus at least partly reversible. This reversible dimension has been postulated to be negatively correlated to the duration of the symptoms, which would mean that the longer the OSA is left untreated, the less reversible are the consequences.

==== Somatic and metabolic consequences ====
Like adults, OSA in children is linked to a higher risk for cardiovascular diseases, due to increased sympathetic activity and impaired cardiac autonomic control. Amongst the cardiovascular dysfunctions resulting from OSA, we can find systemic hypertension and blood pressure dysregulation (elevated blood pressure, or variability of the blood pressure for example). The variability of the blood pressure is correlated with the severity of the symptoms such as the frequency of the apnea and hypopnea. Pulmonary hypertension is also common amongst the cardiovascular problems resulting from OSA. Children with obstructive sleep-disordered breathing also show a faster heart rate during wakefulness and during sleep.

In adult patients, OSA is associated with insulin resistance. In children, metabolic consequences of OSA are complicated to assess as they can also be associated to puberty and obesity (if present). However, when OSA is associated with obesity, the interaction of the two conditions can lead to metabolic disturbances such as insulin resistance and altered lipidemia, liver disease, abdominal adiposity and metabolic syndrome. Obesity interacts with those effects.

==== Nocturnal enuresis ====
Children with OSA also show a higher risk for nocturnal enuresis and it is hypothesized to be caused by an excessive production of urine, impaired performance of the bladder and urethra or an inability to suppress the nocturnal bladder contraction, due to a failure to arouse. The risk for nocturnal enuresis increases with the severity of the sleep-disordered breathing: the more respiratory events per hour of sleep, the higher the risk for nocturnal enuresis. Obesity may also play a role, as it is associated with OSA and with nocturnal diuresis (due to an unhealthy diet). The interaction between OSA and obesity might thus result in nocturnal enuresis. Considering the high prevalence of nocturnal enuresis amongst children with sleep-disordered breathing, it is important to consider the latter in the differential diagnosis of nocturnal enuresis as the treatment of the sleep disorder might have a favourable therapeutic effect on the enuresis. For example, an adenotonsillectomy performed to reduce OSA has a positive impact on nocturnal enuresis. A study has shown that this surgery has a 60–75% chance to resolve the nocturnal enuresis completely, and an 80–85% chance to reduce its symptoms alongside other symptoms of OSA.

==== Stunted growth ====
Untreated OSA in children can also lead to stunted growth. When sleep is disrupted in children who are still growing, there can be significant consequences. Human growth hormone (HGH) is secreted during the night, especially during deep, non-REM sleep. If this is disrupted, growth hormone secretion may be compromised; thus, growth may not occur normally, and children may become shorter than their peers.

==== Other consequences ====
In contrast to adults, excessive daytime sleepiness (EDS) is not the most commonly reported symptoms in children with OSA. However, using objective questionnaires, it is possible to notice that the frequency of EDS in children is higher than what is reported by the parents or caretakers (40–50%). And the risk for EDS is even increased when OSA is associated with obesity.

Due to the consequences and symptoms it generates, OSA in children leads to a significant decrease in quality of life, the decrease being even higher when obesity is present. The quality of life can however be improved with the treatment of OSA. SDB have also been linked to a higher rate of internalizing disorders such as anxiety and depression. Indeed, depressive symptoms have shown to be higher in children with OSA, especially in males. Once again, the severity of depressive symptoms is positively correlated with the severity of the SDB. It also interacts with obesity as obese children have higher risk to show depressive symptoms and obesity can cause OSA. The link can also go the other way around with the depression inducing obesity (due to overeating) which worsens the OSA. Adenotonsillectomy can decrease the intensity of the depressive symptoms.

Other consequences of a disturbed sleep in children with OSA comprise anhedonia increased fatigue and decreased interest in daily activities, which in turn can affect the child's social relationships.

=== In adults ===
While there are some similarities between adults and children, OSA does not have the same consequences in both populations. Examples of similarities are the snoring – which is the most common complaint in both pediatric OSA and OSA in adults – variability of blood pressure and cardiovascular morbidities. A major difference is the excessive daytime sleepiness (EDS) which is commonly reported in adult OSA, while it is not very common in pediatric OSA. Nevertheless, OSA in adults also implies a large scope of adverse and serious consequences, the latter leading to higher mortality amongst OSA patients. Those consequences are even worsened by common morbidities such as obesity.

==== Neurocognitive consequences ====
Similarly to children, OSA affects cognitive functions in adults. Meta-analysis have shown that the most common cognitive impairments happen in the domains of attention, verbal and visual delayed long-term memory, visuospatial/constructional abilities and executive functions, such as mental flexibility. The executive functioning – mainly dominated by the prefrontal cortex – being significantly impaired in patients with OSA, it is believed that the prefrontal region and its connectivity are affected by sleep disorders.

Regarding memory deficits, verbal memory is significantly impaired as patients struggle with immediate and delayed verbal information recall. While meta-analyses have shown no deficits in information retention for patients with OSA, those impairments in verbal memory may be linked to problems in encoding information. This deficit in encoding of information is also noticed in visuo-spatial memory; however, the visual memory seems to be intact in OSA patients.

The cognitive impairments have been suggested to result from sleep fragmentation and sleep deprivation, as well as the excessive daytime sleepiness associated with them. More precisely, attention and memory deficits seem to result from sleep fragmentation, while deficits in global cognitive function (executive function, psychomotor function, language abilities) are more related to hypoxia or hypercarbia, which accompanies the obstructive events during sleep. However, no consistent correlation has been found between the degree of cognitive impairment and the severity of the sleep disturbance or hypoxia.

These impairments may improve with an effective treatment for OSA, such as continuous positive airway pressure (CPAP) therapy. Driving a motor vehicle is an example of a complex task that relies on driver's cognitive abilities, such as attention, reaction time and vigilance. Very brief moments of inattention called microsleep events could be an indicator for daytime vigilance impairment. These may not be present in all drivers with obstructive sleep apnea.

==== Behavioral consequences ====
The hyperactivity and difficulties in emotional regulation found in pediatric patients (children) are not reported in adults. OSA in adults is nevertheless associated with personality changes and automatic behavior. The biggest impact of OSA is the excessive daytime sleepiness (EDS), reported in approximately 30% of OSA patients. EDS can be caused by the disturbance of sleep quality, the insufficient sleep duration or the sleep fragmentation and it is responsible for further complications as it may lead to depressive symptoms, impairments of social life and decreased effectiveness at work. Studies have shown that those consequences of EDS can be improved following a CPAP treatment.

==== Physiological and metabolic consequences ====
OSA in adults is associated with a higher risk for cardiovascular morbidities, diabetes, hypertension, coronary artery disease and stroke – OSA might have a role in the etiology of these conditions. Those conditions may lead to increased mortality that an appropriate treatment for OSA may reduce. OSA is often linked with hypertension as it induces an increase in sympathetic activity that can lead to the elevation of blood pressure. The OSA-related hypercapnia has been suggested to be related to the development of hypertension. Treating the OSA may prevent the development of hypertension. The relationship between OSA and excess body weight is complex, as obesity is more prevalent amongst OSA patients but can also be a risk factor for the development of OSA – it accounts for 58% of adult cases. Thus, both OSA and obesity (when present) may work synergistically and lead to hyperlipidemia, diabetes, insulin resistance and other symptoms of the metabolic syndrome. The metabolic syndrome itself is often associated with OSA: 74–85% of OSA patients are diagnosed with it. CPAP therapy can lead to an improvement of some of the cardiovascular component of the metabolic syndrome while weight loss is also recommended for its positive effects on OSA consequences and metabolic dysfunctions. An intervention comprising exercise and diet is thus effective for the treatment of OSA as it positively impacts the severity of both obesity symptoms and OSA symptoms.

Individuals with Type 2 diabetes are often co-diagnosed with OSA, where Type 2 diabetes prevalence rates range between 15% and 30% within the OSA population. The relationship between OSA and Type 2 diabetes could be explained by the fact that OSA-characteristic fragmented sleep and irregular hypoxemia lead to the dysregulated metabolism of glucose in the blood. In particular, many polysomnography studies showed that OSA left untreated worsens glycemic control in individuals with Type 2 diabetes. However, it is possible that the relationship between OSA and Type 2 diabetes is bidirectional since diabetes-related nerve dysfunction may affect the respiratory system and induce breathing disturbances during sleep.

==== Psychological consequences ====
Sleep is of major importance for psychological and emotional health. As it is greatly impaired in OSA, this condition is associated with mood disorders and several psychological outcomes, especially depression and anxiety. Therefore, psychological disorders are commonly observed in OSA patients who show a higher prevalence of psychological distress, mostly due to the impaired sleep quality and structure and the repeated episodes of hypoxia. The presence of psychological disorders may also worsen the sleep disorders which implies that the psychopathology may either be a factor or a consequence of the OSA. The adverse consequences of OSA such as cardiovascular comorbidities and metabolic disturbances also play a role on the development of mental disorders, and patients with chronic condition have also been reported to have higher risk to experience depression. In OSA patients with psychiatric disorders, it is crucial to treat the OSA as it may reduce the psychiatric symptoms.

Some cases of OSA are caused by nasal obstruction, which has also been related to psychological problems due to an altered ratio of calcium and magnesium in brain cells. Nasal obstruction can thus aggravate the psychological health of OSA patients. Nasal surgery for those patients might decrease the OSA severity and improve the psychological symptoms.

==== Other consequences ====
Untreated OSA also leads to a decreased quality of life, difficulties in social functioning, occupational problems, and accidents and a greatly increased rate of vehicle accidents. Those serious outcomes of OSA are mostly related to the excessive daytime sleepiness resulting from the sleep fragmentation and highlight the need to provide the patients with appropriate treatment. Effective treatment majorly improves those adverse consequences, including quality of life.

OSA patients also frequently report pain disorders, such as headache or fibromyalgia. OSA patients show an increased pain intensity alongside a decreased pain tolerance.

=== Polysomnography ===
Rating	AHI (adult)	AHI (pediatrics)
Normal	< 5	<1
Mild	≥5, <15	≥1, <5
Moderate	≥15, <30	≥5, <10
Severe	≥ 30	≥10

Nighttime in-laboratory Level 1 polysomnography (PSG) is the gold-standard diagnostic test. Patients are monitored with EEG leads, pulse oximetry, temperature or pressure sensors to detect nasal and oral airflow, respiratory impedance plethysmography or similar resistance belts around the chest and abdomen to detect motion, an ECG lead, and EMG sensors to detect muscle contraction in the chin, chest, and legs.

An "event" can be either an apnea, characterized by complete cessation of airflow for at least 10 seconds, or a hypopnea in which airflow decreases by 50 percent for 10 seconds or decreases by 30 percent if there is an associated decrease in the oxygen saturation or an arousal from sleep. To grade the severity of sleep apnea, the number of events per hour is reported as the apnea-hypopnea index (AHI). For adults, an AHI of less than 5 is considered normal, an AHI of [5–15) is mild, [15–30) is moderate, and ≥30 events per hour characterizes severe sleep apnea. For pediatrics, an AHI of less than 1 is considered normal, an AHI of [1–5) is mild, [5–10) is moderate, and ≥10 events per hour characterizes severe sleep apnea.

=== Home oximetry ===
In people who are highly likely to have OSA, home oximetry (a non-invasive method of monitoring blood oxygenation) may be adequate and easier to obtain than formal polysomnography. High probability patients may be identified by an Epworth Sleepiness Scale (ESS) score of 10 or greater and a Sleep Apnea Clinical Score (SACS) of 15 or greater. However, home oximetry does not measure apneic events or respiratory event-related arousals and thus does not produce an AHI value.

== Management ==
Numerous treatment options are used in obstructive sleep apnea. Avoiding alcohol and smoking is recommended, as is avoiding medications that relax the central nervous system (for example, sedatives and muscle relaxants). Weight loss is recommended in those who are overweight. Continuous positive airway pressure (CPAP) and mandibular advancement devices are often used and found to be equally effective. Physical training, even without weight loss, improves sleep apnea. There is insufficient evidence to support widespread use of medications. In selected patients, e.g., with tonsillar hyperplasia, tonsillectomy is recommended. In patients failing CPAP and oral appliances, surgical treatment with conservative uvulopalatopharyngoplasty (UPPP) as salvage surgery is recommended. UPPP has a positive effect on nocturnal respiration and excessive daytime sleepiness.

=== Physical intervention ===
The most widely used therapeutic intervention is positive airway pressure whereby a breathing machine pumps a controlled stream of air through a mask worn over the nose, mouth, or both. The additional pressure holds open the relaxed muscles. There are several variants:

- Continuous positive airway pressure (CPAP) is effective for both moderate and severe disease. It is the most common treatment for obstructive sleep apnea.
- Variable positive airway pressure (VPAP) (also known as bilevel (BiPAP or BPAP)) uses an electronic circuit to monitor the patient's breathing and provides two different pressures, a higher one during inhalation and a lower pressure during exhalation. This system is more expensive and is sometimes used with patients who have other coexisting respiratory problems or who find breathing out against an increased pressure to be uncomfortable or disruptive to their sleep.
- Nasal EPAP, which is a bandage-like device placed over the nostrils that utilizes a person's own breathing to create positive airway pressure to prevent obstructed breathing.
- Automatic positive airway pressure, also known as "Auto CPAP", incorporates pressure sensors and monitors the person's breathing.
- A 5% reduction in weight among those with moderate to severe OSA may decrease symptoms similarly to CPAP.

Encouraging people with moderate to severe OSA to use CPAP devices can be challenging, as their use often requires a behavioural change in sleeping habits. 8% of people who use CPAP devices stop using them after the first night, and 50% of people with moderate to severe OSA stop using their devices in the first year. Educational initiatives and supportive interventions to help improve compliance with CPAP therapy have been shown to improve the length of time people who need CPAP therapy use their devices.

Many people benefit from sleeping at a 30-degree elevation of the upper body or higher, as if in a recliner. Doing so helps prevent the gravitational collapse of the airway. Sleeping on a side as opposed to sleeping on the back ("supine position") is also recommended.

Some studies have suggested that playing a wind instrument (such a didgeridoo, for example) may reduce snoring and apnea incidents. This may be especially true of double reed instruments.

=== Medications ===
Evidence is insufficient to support the use of medications to treat obstructive sleep apnea directly. This includes the use of fluoxetine, paroxetine, acetazolamide, and tryptophan among others.

Recent studies are trying to investigate cannabinoids as a treatment for OSA, especially dronabinol, which is a synthetic form of THC (delta-9-tetrahydrocannabinol). Cannabis is known to influence sleep; for example, it can reduce sleep latency. However, results are not consistent. Studies about dronabinol have shown positive impact on the OSA, as they observed a reduced AHI (Apnea-Hypopnea Index) and an increased self-reported sleepiness (the objective sleepiness being unaffected). However, more evidence are needed as many effects of those substances remain unknown, especially the effects of a long-term intake. The effects on sleepiness and weight gain are particularly of concern. Due to uncertainty about its effects and a lack of consistent evidence, medical cannabis is not recommended for the treatment of OSA.

There are multiple drugs approved for managing the excessive daytime sleepiness associated with OSA, but not the underlying cause. These include solriamfetol, modafinil, and armodafinil.

For adults with obesity and moderate-to-severe OSA, during a 52-week study tirzepatide (brand name Zepbound) substantially reduced apneic-hypopnic events, body weight, hypoxic burden, hsCRP concentration, and systolic blood pressure, and improved sleep-related patient-reported outcomes, all presumably mediated via induced weight loss of 18–20% from baseline. Subsequently, the FDA approved the drug for treatment of OSA in December 2024, and Medicare and many insurers began covering the drug specifically for treatment of OSA in 2025.

=== Dental appliances ===
Mandibular advancement splints (mandibular advancement devices) are designed to hold the lower jaw slightly down and forward relative to the natural, relaxed position. This position keeps the tongue farther away from the back of the airway and may be enough to relieve apnea or improve breathing. This device is a mouthguard similar to those used in sports to protect the teeth. Mandibular advancement splints are used for snoring and for mild to moderate obstructive sleep apnea. They are most suitable for people with AHI < 25, BMI < 30, and good dentition.

Where appropriate, they are considered a good therapy choice as they are non-invasive, easily reversible, and quiet. They are generally well-tolerated because they are less uncomfortable. However, they may not be as effective as CPAP. Oral devices have been shown to treat OSA successfully. These include the polysomnographic indexes of OSA, subjective and objective measures of sleepiness, blood pressure, aspects of neuropsychological functioning, and quality of life. The focus of improvement in appliance design is in reducing bulk, permitting free jaw movement (i.e., yawning, speaking, and drinking), and allowing the user to breathe through their mouth (early "welded gum shield"-type devices prevented oral breathing).

Tongue repositioning (retaining) devices are made of soft acrylic and cover the upper and lower teeth, creating a seal with the lips. They have a "bulb" or "bubble" which sticks out of the front of the mouth. This creates negative suction pressure by holding the tongue in a forward position and increasing the airway space behind the tongue. Hybrid devices combine mandibular advancement with the tongue restraint. These devices have been used for snoring and obstructive sleep apnea. Tongue retaining devices have not been well-received as a therapy choice since they are invasive, and the acclimation period is long. The devices have shown high success rates for therapy.

Soft-palate lifters are devices that lift the soft palate. They are useful for people who have weak muscles in the region.

Evidence to support oral appliances/functional orthopedic appliances in children is insufficient, with very low evidence of effect. However, the oral appliances/functional orthopedic appliances may be considered in specified cases as an auxiliary in the treatment of children with craniofacial anomalies, which are risk factors for apnea.

=== Rapid Palatal Expansion ===
In children, orthodontic treatment to expand the volume of the nasal airway, such as nonsurgical rapid palatal expansion, is common.

Since the palatal suture is fused in adults, regular RPE using tooth-borne expanders cannot be performed. Mini-implant-assisted rapid palatal expansion (MARPE) has been recently developed as a non-surgical option for the transverse expansion of the maxilla in adults. This method increases the volume of the nasal cavity and nasopharynx, leading to increased airflow and reduced respiratory arousals during sleep. Changes are permanent with minimal complications.

=== Surgery ===
Sleep surgery is a range of surgical treatments to modify airway anatomy. They are varied and are tailored to the specific location and nature of the airway obstruction for each individual. Surgery is not considered a first-line treatment for obstructive sleep apnea in adults. For people with obstructive sleep apnea who are unable or unwilling to comply with first-line treatment, surgical intervention is adapted to an individual's specific anatomy and physiology, personal preference, and disease severity. Uvulopalatopharyngoplasty (UPPP) with or without tonsillectomy is the most common surgery for OSA. It is effective in selected patients failing conservative treatment. In Tonsillectomy, the benefit of the surgery increases with tonsil size. However, there is little randomized clinical trial evidence for other types of sleep surgery. There are many different procedures which may be performed, including:

- Septoplasty is a corrective surgical procedure for nasal septum deviation in which the nasal septum is straightened.
- Tonsillectomy or adenoidectomy in an attempt to increase the size of the airway.
- Tonsillotomy
- Removal or reduction of parts of the soft palate and some or all of the uvula, such as uvulopalatopharyngoplasty (UPPP) or laser-assisted uvulopalatoplasty (LAUP). Modern variants of this procedure sometimes use radiofrequency waves to heat and remove tissue.
- Turbinectomy is a surgical procedure in which all or some of the turbinate bones are removed to relieve nasal obstruction.
- Reduction of the tongue base, either with laser excision or radiofrequency ablation.
- Genioglossus advancement, in which a small portion of the lower jaw that attaches to the tongue is moved forward, to pull the tongue away from the back of the airway.
- Hyoid suspension, in which the hyoid bone in the neck, another attachment point for tongue muscles, is pulled forward in front of the larynx.
- Maxillomandibular advancement
- Bariatric surgery (for morbid obesity)
- Hypoglossal nerve stimulation
- Radiofrequency ablation

== Prognosis ==
Stroke and other cardiovascular diseases are related to OSA, and those under the age of 70 have an increased risk of early death. Persons with sleep apnea have a 30% higher risk of heart attack or death than those unaffected. In severe and prolonged cases, increased in pulmonary pressures are transmitted to the right side of the heart. This can result in a severe form of congestive heart failure known as cor pulmonale. Diastolic function of the heart also becomes affected. Elevated arterial pressure (i.e., hypertension) can be a consequence of OSA syndrome. When OSA causes hypertension, it is distinctive in that, unlike most cases (so-called essential hypertension), the readings do not drop significantly when the individual is sleeping (non-dipper) or even increase (inverted dipper).

Without treatment, the sleep deprivation and lack of oxygen caused by sleep apnea increases health risks such as cardiovascular disease, aortic disease (e.g., aortic aneurysm), high blood pressure, stroke, diabetes, clinical depression, weight gain, obesity, and even death.

OSA is associated with cognitive impairment, including deficits in inductive and deductive reasoning, attention, vigilance, learning, executive functions, and episodic and working memory. OSA is associated with increased risk for developing mild cognitive impairment and dementia, and has been associated with neuroanatomical changes (reductions in volumes of the hippocampus, and gray matter volume of the frontal and parietal lobes) which can however be at least in part reversed with CPAP treatment.

== Epidemiology ==
Until the 1990s, little was known regarding the frequency of OSA. A recent meta-analysis of 24 epidemiological studies on the prevalence of OSA in the general population aged 18 and older revealed that for ≥ 5 apnea events per hour, OSA prevalence ranged from 9% to 38%, specifically ranging from 13% to 33% in men and 6% to 19% in women, while in the population aged 65 and older, OSA prevalence was as high as 84%, including 90% in men and 78% in women. Nevertheless, for ≥ 15 apnea events per hour, OSA prevalence ranged from 6% to 17%, and almost 49% prevalence in the older population aged 65 and older. Moreover, a higher BMI is also linked to a higher prevalence of OSA, where a 10% increase in body weight led to a 6-fold risk of OSA in obese men and women.

However, OSA is underdiagnosed as it is not always accompanied by daytime sleepiness which can leave the sleep-disordered breathing unnoticed. The prevalence of OSA with daytime sleepiness is thus estimated to affect 3% to 7% of men and 2% to 5% of women, and the disease is common in both developed and developing countries. OSA prevalence increases with age and is most commonly diagnosed in individuals over 65 years old, with estimations ranging from 22.1% to 83.6%. The prevalence has drastically increased in recent decades due to the incidence of obesity.

Men are more affected by OSA than women, but the phenomenology differs between the genders. Snoring and witnessed apnea are more frequent among men but insomnia for example is more frequent among women. The OSA frequency increase with age for the women, and is in particular linked to the onset of menopause and associated hormonal changes. The mortality is higher for women.

If studied carefully in a sleep lab by polysomnography (formal "sleep study"), it is believed that approximately 1 in 5 American adults would have at least mild OSA. In the US, some studies report that it is more frequent among the Hispanic and African American population than among the white population.

== Society and culture ==
=== United States of America ===
In the US, home sleep testing is increasingly being preferred by private insurance carriers. For individuals who have high co-pays or deductibles, a home sleep test can be done for a fraction of the cost of polysomnography.

Radiofrequency ablation was recognized by the American Academy of Otolaryngology as a somnoplasty treatment option in selected situations for mild to moderate OSA, but the evidence was judged insufficient for routine adoption by the American College of Physicians.

== Research ==
Neurostimulation is being studied as a method of treatment. An implanted hypoglossal nerve stimulation system received European CE Mark (Conformité Européenne) approval in March 2012. Also being studied are exercises of the muscles around the mouth and throat through activities such as playing the didgeridoo.

== See also ==
- Congenital central hypoventilation syndrome
- Obesity hypoventilation syndrome
- Periodic breathing
- Upper airway resistance syndrome
