= Hypoglossal nerve stimulation =

Novel strategy for the treatment of obstructive sleep apnea

Hypoglossal nerve stimulation (HNS) is a treatment for obstructive sleep apnea. It involves implanting a small device that sends electrical impulses to the hypoglossal nerve (the twelfth cranial nerve) during sleep, causing the tongue to move forward and preventing airway blockage. The first HNS device was approved for use in Europe in 2013 and by the U.S. Food and Drug Administration (FDA) in 2014, and since then the treatment has been adopted in multiple countries for thousands of patients.

== Eligibility criteria ==
HNS therapy is intended for adults with moderate to severe obstructive sleep apnea who meet specific medical criteria. Candidates typically have an apnea–hypopnea index (AHI) between about 15 and 65 events per hour, indicating moderate or severe OSA. Patients should first have attempted CPAP therapy, and either failed to achieve adequate results or been unable to tolerate CPAP use. Because obesity can contribute to poor outcomes with HNS, candidates are usually required to have a body mass index (BMI) below a certain cutoff (often ≤ 32–35 kg/m^2). In clinical practice and trials, patients with a BMI above roughly 32 kg/m^2 were significantly less likely to respond to the treatment.

Other key selection factors include ensuring the OSA is predominantly obstructive (with central or mixed sleep apnea events accounting for less than 25% of the total AHI). Before offering HNS, doctors perform a drug-induced sleep endoscopy (DISE) to examine the patient’s airway during a sedated “sleep” state. The purpose of DISE is to confirm that the pattern of airway collapse is one that HNS can alleviate. In particular, the patient must not have a complete concentric collapse at the level of the soft palate, because simply moving the tongue forward would not resolve an all-around collapse of the airway at that location. A collapse primarily in the anteroposterior (front-to-back) dimension, which HNS can counteract by protruding the tongue, is the preferred finding. Patients with very large tonsils that could physically prevent the device from working are also excluded until those issues are addressed.

In summary, HNS is generally indicated for adult OSA patients meet the following criteria:

1. Moderate-to-severe OSA (AHI in approximately the 15–65 range) with mainly obstructive events.
2. An inability to use CPAP successfully (due to lack of efficacy or intolerance).
3. Polysomnography conducted within 24 months prior to the initial consult for HNS implantation.
4. A body mass index below 32-35 kg/m^2.
5. Favorable airway anatomy, confirmed by drug-induced sleep endoscopy, without a complete concentric collapse at the soft palate.
6. No other anatomical findings that would compromise performance of device.

== Procedure details ==
In this procedure, an electrical stimulator lead is placed around branches of the hypoglossal nerve that control tongue protrusion (e.g., genioglossus) via an incision in the neck. A sensor lead is then placed in the chest between the ribs in the layer between the internal intercostal muscles and external intercostal muscles. The stimulator and sensory lead are then connected via a tunneled wire to an implantable pulse generator. When turned on during sleep, the sensory lead in the chest detects the respiratory cycle. During inspiration (i.e., inhale), an electrical signal is fired via the stimulator lead in the neck, stimulating the hypoglossal nerve, and causing the tongue to protrude, thereby alleviating obstruction.

== Post-operative and long term care ==
Once implanted, the hypoglossal nerve stimulator is typically activated in clinic approximately 4 weeks afterwards. The implant may be configured to best accommodate the patient's comfort and sleeping habits (e.g., set a delay based on sleep latency).

The hypoglossal nerve stimulator implantable pulse generator battery life typically lasts 8–12 years, after which the implantable pulse generator may be safely replaced with another surgery.
