= Periodic breathing =

Clusters of breaths separated by intervals of apnea or near-apnea

Periodic breathing is clusters of breaths separated by intervals of apnea or near-apnea. As opposed to normal breathing, which is usually regular, periodic breathing is defined as three or more episodes of central apnea lasting at least 4 seconds, separated by no more than 30 seconds of normal breathing.

Periodic breathing was originally thought to arise from serious neurologic or cardiovascular disease and therefore to carry a poor outlook. It is now known that periodic breathing also tends to occur during sleep, it can occur in healthy persons, and the apnea in periodic breathing is usually central sleep apnea rather than obstructive sleep apnea.

Periodic breathing during sleep occurs typically in adult patients with congestive heart failure.

Periodic breathing is also a normal variation of breathing found in premature and full term infants. It occurs when the infant has pauses in breathing for no more than 10 seconds at a time followed by a series of rapid, shallow breaths. Then the breathing returns to normal without any stimulation or intervention. These pauses in breathing may be accompanied by minor oxygen desaturation and bradycardia. It usually occurs when the infant is sleeping deeply, but may occur with light sleep or even when awake. Studies have shown that 78% of healthy full-term infants experience episodes of periodic breathing in the first two weeks of life, which typically resolves in the first six months of life.

== Types ==
1. Cheyne-Stokes respiration

2. Biot's respiration
