= Nasal EPAP =

Snoring and sleep apnea treatment device

Nasal expiratory positive airway pressure

Nasal expiratory positive airway pressure (Nasal EPAP) is a treatment for obstructive sleep apnea (OSA) and snoring.

Contemporary EPAP devices have two small valves that allow air to be drawn in through each nostril, but not exhaled; the valves are held in place by adhesive tabs on the outside of the nose. The mechanism by which EPAP may work is not clear; it may be that the resistance to nasal exhalation leads to a buildup in CO_{2} which in turn increases respiratory drive, or that resistance to exhalation generates pressure that forces the upper airway to open wider.

In OSA it appears to be effective to reduce but not eliminate apnea for people with mild to moderate OSA (Apnea–hypopnea index < 30) and for people who cannot tolerate CPAP, but within those groups it is not clear why some respond and others do not, and the evidence consists of small clinical trials with follow-up no longer than one year. As of 2015 there was evidence from one small trial that it may be useful in children with OSA. It has shown evidence of reducing snoring as well.

EPAP is unlikely to be effective in people with significant nasal obstruction. Side effects that emerged during clinical trials included difficulty breathing, difficulty falling or staying asleep, dry mouth, nasal congestion, headache, difficulty putting on or removing the device, and anxiety.

Ventus Medical received FDA 510K clearance for marketing the Provent EPAP device for OSA in 2009. Ventus received 510K clearance for an EPAP device to treat snoring in June 2012. Ventus was acquired by Theravent Inc. in 2013.
