= Respiratory disturbance index =

Formula used in sleep studies

The respiratory disturbance index (RDI)—or respiratory distress Index—is a formula used in reporting polysomnography (sleep study) findings. Like the apnea-hypopnea index (AHI), it reports on respiratory distress events during sleep, but unlike the AHI, it also includes respiratory-effort related arousals (RERAs). RERAs are arousals from sleep that do not technically meet the definitions of apneas or hypopneas, but do in some way disrupt breathing during sleep and cause respiratory symptoms that may cause an arousal.

A RERA is characterized by increasing respiratory effort such as dyspneas (and thus decreasing esophageal pressures) for 10 seconds or more leading to an arousal from sleep, but one that does not fulfill the criteria for a hypopnea or apnea.

== Diagnosis ==
The gold standard method for measuring RERAs is esophageal manometry, as recommended by the American Academy of Sleep Medicine (AASM). However, esophageal manometry is uncomfortable for patients, may disrupt sleep and is impractical to use in most sleep centers.

Some research studies have found that a high RDI was significantly correlated with excessive daytime sleepiness, and that this correlation was stronger than that for the frequency of oxygen saturation decreases below 85%, but other studies have found only a weak and unreliable correlation. More recent studies have found more impressive outcomes of methods in treating patients with RERAs and respiratory events that satisfy the definition of hypopneas in all aspects other than reduction of oxygen saturation levels.

The American Academy of Sleep Medicine uses RDI to determine the severity of Obstructive Sleep Apnea according to the following range: 5–14.9 for mild, 15–29.9 for moderate, and 30+ for severe, similar to the one used in the AHI.

== Formula ==
The formula to assessing the RDI is = (RERAs + Hypopneas + Apneas) X 60 / TST (in minutes). That is, RDI means the average number of episodes of obstructive apnea, hypopnea, and respiratory event-related arousal per hour of sleep. (TST is "total sleep time".)

== See also ==
- Apnea-hypopnea index
- Obstructive sleep apnea
- Hypopnea
- Apnea
- Sleep apnea
