= Peripheral Arterial Tone =

Peripheral Arterial Tone (PAT) is a noninvasive measure designed to track pulsatile volume changes in peripheral arterial beds. The collected information gives specialists important insight into the autonomic nervous system and the cardiovascular system. PAT technology is mostly used to detect heart disease, erectile dysfunction and obstructive sleep apnea.

== The PAT technology ==
The PAT signal is a form of pulse wave amplitude measured by incorporating both a unified pressure field and a specific isosbestic wavelength. Applying a uniform pressure field around the measured surface releases arterial wall motion restriction, magnifies the dynamic range of the recorded signal, and prevents the distention of the veins distal to the site of pressure application. The use of an isosbestic wavelength results in both oxyhaemoglobin and deoxyhaemoglobin having the same absorption level, thereby preventing oxygen saturation level changes. These features result in high signal quality which differentiate PAT technology from other traditional peripheral pulse measurement methods.

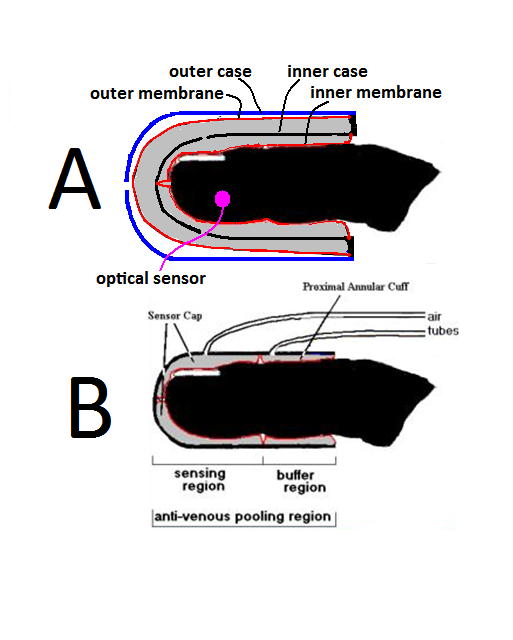
A) Pneumo-optical Probe, B) Pneumatic Probe.

== Development history ==
The technology to acquire the PAT signal was developed by Dr. Bob Schnall and Dr. Koby Sheffy at Prof. Peretz Lavie's Technion laboratory following an observation made by a thoracic surgeon, Dr. Daniel Goor, who observed that during open heart surgery, when the heart becomes ischemic, the patient's fingers become very cold and blueish. This was explained by increased sympathetic activity and the unique innervation of the finger's arterial bed by solely alpha-adrenergic receptors pathways. As the PAT signal was manifesting sympathetic activity it was later used to assess exercise stress testing, mental stress response and sleep apnea. It is also used to assess endothelial function as the endothelial cells in the arterial walls also regulate vasoactivity.

The first company to utilize PAT technology in its medical devices was Itamar Medical, an Israeli medical device manufacturer. Itamar developed unique probes with contiguous cuffs which are capable of applying a unified pressure to a finger, including its most distal tip. There are two versions of PAT probes developed by Itamar Medical: A pneumo-optical sensing PAT probe, and a pneumatic sensing probe: The pneumo-optical sensing based probe detects optical density changes of the measured finger and generates its own self-contained pressure field, by virtue of an arrangement of inner and outer membranes. The pressure applied within the probe is independent of the volume of the finger, based on use of the outer pre-tensioned membrane, and governed by the Young–Laplace equation. The pneumatic sensing probe, senses finger blood volume changes based on pressure changes within a conventional constant volume, variable pressure pneumatic system, which also supplies the desired level of pressure to be used.

== Clinical applications of the PAT technology ==
The PAT Technology has received regulatory approval in several countries to diagnose a variety of conditions involving changes in sympathetic activity. The most common use of the PAT technology is in detection of sleep disordered breathing such as obstructive sleep apnea and central sleep apnea.

=== PAT technology in sleep disordered breathing ===
A hallmark of sleep disordered breathing is the occurrence of arousals during sleep. Such arousals elicit generalized autonomic activation, which among other physiological changes, includes sympathetic nervous system-mediated peripheral vasoconstriction, and transient pulse rate elevation. The PAT technology allows measurement of these changes in order to accurately diagnose sleep disordered breathing.
