= Expiratory apnea =

Breathing technique in heart examination

Expiratory apnea is the temporary cessation of breathing following expiration. During physical examination, particularly cardiac auscultation, a clinician may ask a patient to exhale and briefly hold their breath in order to reduce respiratory sounds and chest wall movement, thereby facilitating clearer auscultation of heart sounds with a stethoscope.

In respiratory physiology, expiratory apnea refers to breath-holding at the end of expiration and is distinct from prolonged expiration, during which airflow is still present.

== See also ==
- Apnea
