= Airway tone =

Degree of activation of airway muscle

Airway tone, short for airway smooth muscle tone, is the degree of sustained contractile activation of airway smooth muscle. The airways have a tone baseline, and consequently a baseline level of contraction of their smooth musculature. Airway tone is a key determinant of lung function and the presence of respiratory symptoms in obstructive lung diseases such as asthma, where baseline airway tone is elevated. The upper extreme of the spectrum of airway tone represents bronchoconstriction, wherein the airway smooth muscles are significantly contracted, while the lower extreme represents bronchodilatation, wherein the muscles are relatively relaxed.

While airway tone is related to respiratory airflow and airway caliber insofar as an increase in airway tone decreases airflow due to the airway smooth muscle contraction, the two are not synonymous as airflow is determined by the structural and functional properties of the airways as well as the lung parenchyma in addition to airway tone.

Airway tone and airway resistance are mostly correlated, but adequate upper airway tone is necessary for airflow and airway patency; insufficient upper airway tone during sleep can, for instance, result in obstructive sleep apnea.

== Autonomic nervous system signalling ==
Autonomic nervous system signalling plays a pivotal role in determining airway tone. The innervation of airway smooth musculature varies between the upper and lower airways.

=== Upper airway tone ===
The pharynx is innervated by cranial nerves VII, IX, XII, while both the pharynx and the larynx are innervated by the vagus nerve.

=== Lower airway tone ===
Lower airway, bronchial, or bronchus tone is mediated both by the innervation of airway smooth musculature and, possibly, also by the innervation of airway mucosal vasculature. Lower airway smooth muscles are mostly only innervated by the vagus nerve.

==== Cholinergic signalling ====
Airway smooth muscle is primarily innervated by cholinergic parasympathetic nerves, while its adrenergic sympathetic innervation is sparse to non-existent. Specifically, cholinergic parasympathetic signalling increases the airway tone, meaning the airway tone is proportional to the vagal tone.

Despite this overall airway tone-increasing effect, the individual effects of muscarinic acetylcholine receptors expressed by airway muscle cells, of which there are 5 subtypes, M_{1} through M_{5}, are ambivalent. M_{3} receptors directly lead to airway smooth muscle contraction, i.e., an increase in airway tone, while M_{2} receptors (also) expressed by airway neurons suppress the further release of acetylcholine in a negative feedback loop, wherein cholinergic parasympathetic signalling reduces further cholinergic parasympathetic signalling, which may explain the unexpectedly low effectivity of certain non-selective muscarinic receptor antagonists such as ipratropium bromide.

M_{2} receptors are less functional in asthma, disrupting the negative feedback which normally reduces airway tone, which may play a role in asthmatic airway hyperresponsiveness.

==== Adrenergic signalling ====
As mentioned, adrenergic sympathetic innervation of airway smooth muscle is likely insignificant; however, the sympathetic innervation of the airway mucosal vasculature is significant. Airway muscular vasculature controls the flow of nutrients to the airways, the temperature of the airways, as well as the clearance of insoluble particles in the airways, which may play an important role in the activity of inhaled bronchodilators, thus affecting airway reactivity and airway tone changes in obstructive lung diseases.

==== Dopaminergic signalling ====
There is conflicting evidence regarding dopamine's effect on airway tone in vivo, with some studies reporting bronchoconstriction and others bronchodilatation following dopamine inhalation. In one study, dopamine attenuated the increase in airway tone caused by cholinergic signalling, but exacerbated histaminergic bronchoconstriction, while both signals were attenuated in the present study following the administration of intravenous dopamine. Thus, no conclusion can be drawn at this time.

Acute activation of D_{2} receptors expressed by airway smooth muscle cells inhibits the adenylyl cyclase, lowering cAMP levels, leading to an increase in airway tone. However, their prolonged activation by quinpirole, a D_{2} and D_{3} receptor agonist, paradoxically enhances adenylyl cyclase activity, raising cAMP levels, leading to bronchodilatation via phospholipase C and protein kinase C.

==== Histaminergic signalling ====
Histamine is a direct bronchoconstrictor that increases airway tone by activating H_{1} receptors expressed by airway smooth muscle cells.

== Bitter taste receptor signalling ==
Six type 2 (bitter) taste receptors (TAS2Rs) are expressed by airway smooth muscle cells. In the tongue, bitter taste receptors have probably evolved for avoiding the ingestion of plant toxins. In the lungs, bitter taste receptors serve a paradoxically reversed function, causing the relaxation of airway smooth muscle, i.e., a lowering of airway tone. Thus, bitter taste receptor agonists represent promising potential novel bronchodilators.

== Phosphodiesterase inhibition ==
Theophylline's non-selective phosphodiesterase inhibition has been proposed as the mechanism behind its bronchodilatating action. Phosphodiesterases degrade intracellular cAMP, which leads to muscle contraction. Inhibiting phosphodiesterases increases cAMP concentrations in airway smooth muscle cells, lowering airway tone. Adenosine receptor agonism probably does not play a major role in theophylline-induced lowering of airway tone, as inhalation of adenosine actually increases airway tone, though it is probably the cause of theophylline's arrhythmogenicity.

== Cysteinyl leukotriene signalling ==
Like histamine, some cysteinyl leukotrienes, such as leukotriene D_{4}, are direct bronchoconstrictors and increase airway tone by binding to receptors on airway smooth muscle cells. Bronchoconstrictive leukotrienes act via a common cys-LT_{1} receptor.

== Thromboxane signalling ==
Thromboxane is a direct bronchoconstrictor that acts via the thromboxane receptor on airway smooth muscle cells.
