= Uvulopalatoplasty =

Medical procedure

- ICD-9-CM: 27.6, 27.7

Uvulopalatoplasty is a surgical procedure performed with the aim of reducing or eliminating snoring. It is an out-patient procedure, in which a laser is used to remove parts or all of the uvula at the rear of the mouth. The surgery usually requires three to five visits, with each lasting less than 30 minutes. It is performed with the patient awake under local anesthesia, and normal functions can be resumed after the operation. An LAUP (Laser-assisted uvulopalatoplasty) procedure typically costs between two and three thousand American dollars. The principal side effect is a severe sore throat which can last from 7 – 10 days. Speaking is not usually affected. Typically a CO_{2} type laser is used.

Uvulopalatoplasty was developed in the 1980s by Dr. Yves-Victor Kamami, a surgeon of the Marie-Louise Clinic in Paris, France, who published his first articles on the subject in 1990. Kamami claimed that it was not only a successful treatment for snoring, but also for obstructive sleep apnea. Early results seemed favourable, and studies of flawed methodology were published. Long-term follow-up information was omitted entirely. The practice of using lasers to address snoring became widespread. Some surgeons have since stated that the procedure is not as effective as Kamami claimed, while others report a success rate of 85%. The difference depends largely on the surgeon's experience and ability. During the late 1990s and the 2000s, researchers (including Finkelstein, Schmidt, Larrosa and others) published data which questioned the efficiency of the treatment and demonstrated that in a considerable number of cases, laser-assisted uvulopalatoplasty may also cause mild obstructive sleep apnea in patients who has been nonapneic snorers, or lead to deterioration of existing apnea. These results are attributable to thermal damage inflicted by the laser beam. The laser may induce progressive palatal fibrosis, accompanied by medial traction of the posterior tonsillar pillars i.e., scar tissue reduces the airspace in the pharynx leading to velopharyngeal insufficiency. The scar tissue can also make the airway more prone to collapse during sleep. LAUP can be a medically induced cause of sleep apnea. Despite adverse results, LAUP continues to be administered by a minority of surgeons.
