= Central sleep apnea =

Sleep-related disorder in which the effort to breathe is diminished

- Other names: Primary alveolar hypoventilation, alveolar hypoventilation secondary to neurologic disease, idiopathic acquired central hypoventilation syndrome
- Specialty: Neurology

Central sleep apnea (CSA) or central sleep apnea syndrome (CSAS) is a sleep-related disorder in which the effort to breathe is diminished or absent, typically for 10 to 30 seconds either intermittently or in cycles, and is usually associated with a reduction in blood oxygen saturation. CSA is usually due to an instability in the body's feedback mechanisms that control respiration. This type of sleep apnea can also be an indicator of Arnold–Chiari malformation.

== Signs and symptoms ==
In a healthy person during sleep, breathing is regular, so that the concentration of oxygen and carbon dioxide in the blood stays fairly constant: After exhalation, the blood oxygen falls and carbon dioxide rises. Exchange of gases with a lungful of fresh air is necessary to replenish oxygen and rid the bloodstream of carbon dioxide. Oxygen and carbon dioxide receptors in the body (called chemoreceptors) send nerve impulses to the brain, which then signals for reflexive opening of the larynx (enlarging the opening between the vocal cords) and movements of the rib-cage muscles and diaphragm. These muscles expand the thorax (chest cavity) so that a partial vacuum is made in the lungs and air rushes in to fill it. In the absence of central apnea, any sudden drop in oxygen or excess of carbon dioxide, even if small, strongly stimulates the brain's respiratory centers to breathe; the respiratory drive is so strong that even conscious efforts to hold one's breath do not overcome it.

In pure central sleep apnea, the brain's respiratory control centers, in pre-Botzinger complex, are imbalanced during sleep and fail to give the signal to inhale, causing the person to miss one or more cycles of breathing. The neurological feedback mechanism that monitors blood carbon dioxide and in turn stimulates respiration fails to react quickly enough to maintain an even respiratory rate, allowing the entire respiratory system to cycle between apnea and hyperpnea, even for a brief time after an awakening during a breathing pause. The sleeper stops breathing for up to two minutes and then starts again. There is no effort made to breathe during the pause in breathing: there are no chest movements and no muscular struggling; when awakening occurs in the middle of a pause, the inability to immediately operate the breathing muscles often results in cognitive struggle accompanied by a feeling of panic exacerbated by the feeling associated with excessive blood CO_{2} levels. Even in severe cases of central sleep apnea, however, the effects almost always result in pauses that make breathing irregular rather than cause the total cessation of breathing over the medium term. After the episode of apnea, breathing may be faster and/or more intense (hyperpnea) for a while; this is a compensatory effort to blow off retained waste gases, absorb more oxygen, and, when voluntary, enable a return to normal instinctive breathing patterns by restoring oxygen to the breathing muscles themselves.

=== Secondary effects ===
The conditions of hypoxia and hypercapnia, whether caused by apnea or not, trigger additional effects on the body. The immediate effects of central sleep apnea on the body depend on how long the failure to breathe endures, how short the interval is between failures to breathe, and the presence or absence of independent conditions whose effects amplify those of an apneic episode.

- Brain cells need constant oxygen to live, and if the level of blood oxygen remains low enough for long enough, brain damage and even death will occur. These effects, however, are rarely a result of central sleep apnea, which is a chronic condition whose effects are usually much milder.
- Drops in blood oxygen levels that are severe but not severe enough to trigger brain-cell or overall death may trigger seizures even in the absence of epilepsy.
- In severe cases of sleep apnea, the more translucent areas of the body will show a bluish or dusky cast from cyanosis, the change in hue ("turning blue") produced by the deoxygenation of blood in vessels near the skin.
- Compounding effects of independent conditions:

- In persons with epilepsy, the hypoxia caused by apnea may be powerful enough to trigger seizures even in the presence of medication that otherwise controls those seizures well.
- In adults with coronary artery disease, a severe drop in blood oxygen level can cause angina, arrhythmias, or heart attacks (myocardial infarction).
- Longstanding and recurrent episodes of apnea may, over months and years, have the cumulative effect of increasing blood carbon dioxide levels to the point that enough carbon dioxide dissolves in the blood to form carbonic acid in overall proportions sufficient to cause respiratory acidosis.
- In persons who have either or both forms of sleep apnea, breathing irregularities during sleep can be dangerously aggravated by taking respiration-depressing drugs, especially sedative drugs that operate by depressing the central nervous system generally; respiratory depressants include opiates, barbiturates, benzodiazepines, and, in large quantities, alcohol, the last three of which are broad-spectrum CNS depressants. Quantities that are normally considered safe may cause the person with chronic sleep apnea to stop breathing altogether. Should these individuals have general anaesthesia, for example, they require prolonged monitoring after initial recovery, as compared to a person with no history of sleep apnea, because apnea is likely to occur with even low levels of the drugs in their system.
- Sudden infant death syndrome is sometimes theorized to be attributable to sleep apnea; the recommendation, prevalent since the mid-1980s, of placing infants on their backs rather than their stomachs for sleep represents an attempt to prevent those instances of breathing cessation that are attributable to compressive obstruction.
- Premature infants with immature brains and reflex systems are at high risk for central sleep apnea syndrome, even if these babies are otherwise healthy. Premature babies who have the syndrome will generally outgrow it as they mature, provided that they receive careful enough monitoring and supportive care during infancy to survive. Because of premature infants' propensity toward central apnea, medications that can cause respiratory drive depression are either not given to them or administered to them only under careful monitoring, with resuscitation equipment immediately available. Such precautions are routinely taken for premature infants after general anesthesia; administration of caffeine has been found not only to aid in maintenance of respiratory function after general anaesthesia but to reduce apnea for preterm infants regardless of context.

== Diagnosis ==
AHI	Rating
5 to <15 apneas or hypopneas per hour of sleep	Mild sleep apnea/hypopnea
15 to <30 apneas or hypopneas per hour of sleep	Moderate sleep apnea/hypopnea

A diagnosis of sleep apnea requires determination by a physician. The examination may require a study of an individual in a sleep lab, although the AAST has said a two belt IHT (In Home Test) will replace a PSG (polysomnography) (a sleep study) for diagnosing obstructive apnea. There, the patient will be monitored while at rest, and the periods when breathing ceases will be measured with respect to length and frequency. During a PSG, a person with sleep apnea shows breathing interruptions followed by drops/reductions in blood oxygen and increases in blood carbon dioxide level.

- In adults, a pause must last 10 seconds to be scored as an apnea. However, in young children, who normally breathe at a much faster rate than adults, shorter pauses may still be considered apneas.
- Hypopneas in adults are defined as a 30% reduction in air flow for more than ten seconds, followed by oxygen-saturation declines of at least 3% or 4% per the AASM standards. and/or EEG arousal. The Apnea-Hypopnea Index (AHI) is expressed as the number of apneas or hypopneas per hour of sleep.

As noted above, in central sleep apnea, the cessation of airflow is associated with the absence of physical attempts to breathe; specifically, polysomnograms reveal a correlation between the absence of rib cage and abdominal movements and cessation of airflow at the nose and lips. By contrast, in obstructive sleep apnea, pauses are not correlated with the absence of attempts to breathe and may even be correlated with more effortful breathing in an instinctive attempt to overcome the pressure on the affected person's airway. If the majority of a sleep-apnea patient's apneas/hypopneas are central, their condition is classified as central; likewise, if the majority are obstructive, their condition is classified as obstructive.

=== Criteria ===
CSA is divided into 6 categories:

- primary CSA;
- Cheyne–Stokes breathing (CSB);
- high-altitude periodic breathing;
- CSA due to a medical condition without CSB;
- CSA due to a medication or substance;
- treatment emergent central apnea (also called complex sleep apnea).

The following symptoms are present in primary CSA: excessive daytime sleepiness, frequent arousals and awakenings during sleep or insomnia complaints, awakening short of breath, snoring, witnessed apneas. The patient's polysomnography shows ≥5 central apneas and/or central hypopneas per hour of sleep, representing at least 50% of total respiratory events in the apnea-hypopnea index. CSA with CSB is characterized by at least one of the criteria of primary CSA or the presence of atrial fibrillation/flutter, congestive heart failure, or a neurologic disorder. The patient's polysomnography looks like the primary CSA polysomnography with the addition of a ventilatory pattern compatible with CSB. High-altitude periodic breathing requires that the patient has recently been at least 2500 meters above sea level. In CSA due to a medication or substance, opioids or other respiratory depressants must have been taken. For CSA due to a medical condition without CSB, the criteria are the same as primary CSA, but the symptoms are caused by a disease. Treatment emergent CSA must appear only after treatment for obstructive respiratory events has begun.

=== Differential diagnosis ===
Although central and obstructive sleep apnea have some signs and symptoms in common, others are present in one but absent in another, enabling differential diagnosis as between the two types:

Signs and symptoms of sleep apnea generally

- Signs:

- Observed breathing pauses during sleep
- High carbon-dioxide saturation of blood, especially just before awakenings during which a patient experiences an urgent need to breathe (see "Symptoms" below)
- Low oxygen saturation of blood
- Heart rate increase (response to both hypercapnia and hypoxemia/hypoxia), unless there also exist problems with the heart muscle itself or the autonomic nervous system severe enough to make this compensatory increase impossible

- Symptoms:

- High frequency of urgent need to breathe upon awakening (symptom created by hypercapnia), especially among a subset of awakenings occurring at times other than normal for an individual's sleep schedule and circadian rhythms

Signs and symptoms of central sleep apnea

- Signs:

- Lack of abdominal and thoracic movement for 10 seconds or longer during sleep and coincident with breathing pauses

- Symptoms:

- Inability, either complete or without excessive effort, to voluntarily operate the diaphragm and other thoracic muscles upon awakening

- The combination of this symptom with a high frequency of urgent need to breathe upon awakening is especially specific in that the co-presence of the latter symptom differentiates central sleep apnea's presentation from that of sleep paralysis generally.

Signs and symptoms of and conditions associated with obstructive sleep apnea

- Signs:

- Observably ineffective respiratory movements (observable lack of air flow despite observable muscle movements indicating efforts to breathe)
- Snoring (high-sensitivity but low-specificity)
- Observably dry mouth or throat (high-sensitivity but low-specificity)

- Symptoms:

- Sleepiness, fatigue, or tiredness, often rising to the level of excessive daytime sleepiness
- Frequent feelings of choking (airway and/or lung compression), as distinguished from a mere feeling of suffocation, nonspecific with respect to the presence/absence of pressure, upon awakening

- Associated conditions:

- Opioid medication use
- Large neck circumference (>16" for females, > 17" for males) (frequent causal factor and possible indirect symptom; see "Obesity" below)
- Obesity (frequent causal factor and possible, albeit low-specificity, sign both direct and indirect): Obesity frequently involves accumulation of fat below the chin and around the neck, depressing the trachea when one is in the supine position, and central obesity can, depending on an individual's fat distribution, lead to increased direct pressure on the thoracic cavity and/or compressive anterior (headward) displacement of the abdominal organs, in the second case reducing space for and increasing difficulty of the motion of the diaphragm. Poor breathing during sleep a] reduces oxygen available for metabolism and may therefore depress basal metabolic rate during sleep, increasing the difference between supply of food energy and demand for it during that time and thereby promoting weight gain, and b] reduces sleep quality and recovery per time unit of sleep, resulting in sleepiness or fatigue that may prompt affected people to eat more in an attempt to increase short-term energy levels.
- Correlation with cardiac disorders:

- Atrial fibrillation (AF): A study in the medical journal Sleep found that the prevalence of atrial fibrillation among patients with idiopathic central sleep apnea was significantly higher than the prevalence among patients with obstructive sleep apnea or no sleep apnea (27%, 1.7%, and 3.3%, respectively). The study was based on 180 subjects, with 60 people in each of the 3 groups. Possible explanations for the association between CSA and AF include a causal relationship in one direction or the other between the two conditions or a common cause involving an abnormality of central cardiorespiratory regulation.
- Adults with congestive heart failure are at risk for a form of central apnea called Cheyne-Stokes respiration, which manifests itself both during sleep and during waking hours. Cheyne-Stokes respiration is characterized by periodic breathing featuring recurrent episodes of apnea alternating with episodes of rapid breathing. There is good evidence that replacement of the failing heart (heart transplant) cures central apnea in these patients. Temporary measures (e.g., those taken pending the availability of an organ donor) include the administration of drugs whose effects include respiratory stimulation, although these drugs are not universally effective in reducing the severity of Cheyne-Stokes apneas.

=== Congenital central hypoventilation syndrome ===
Congenital central hypoventilation syndrome (CCHS), often referred to by its older name "Ondine's curse," is a rare and very severe inborn form of abnormal interruption and reduction in breathing during sleep. This condition involves a specific homeobox gene, PHOX2B, which guides maturation of the autonomic nervous system; certain loss-of-function mutations interfere with the brain's development of the ability to effectively control breathing. There may be a recognizable pattern of facial features among individuals affected by this syndrome.

Once almost uniformly fatal, CCHS is now treatable. Children who have it must have tracheotomies and access to mechanical ventilation on respirators while sleeping, but most do not need to use a respirator while awake. The use of a diaphragmatic pacemaker may offer an alternative for some patients. When pacemakers have enabled some children to sleep without the use of a mechanical respirator, reported cases still required the tracheotomy to remain in place because the vocal cords did not move apart with inhalation.

Persons with the syndrome who survive to adulthood are strongly instructed to avoid certain condition-aggravating factors, such as alcohol use, which can easily prove lethal.

== Treatment ==
After a patient receives a diagnosis, the diagnosing physician can provide different options for treatment. If central sleep apnea is medication-induced (e.g., opioids), reducing the dose or eventual withdrawal of the offending medication often improves CSA.

- The FDA has recently approved a pacemaker-like implantable device called the remedē System for adult patients with moderate to severe central sleep apnea. After a commonly performed procedure, the device stimulates a nerve in the chest (phrenic nerve) to send signals to the large muscle that controls breathing (the diaphragm). It monitors respiratory signals during sleep and helps restore normal breathing patterns. The device is silent, activates automatically during the night, and does not require the patient to wear a mask.
- Mechanical regulation of airflow and/or airway pressure:

- Treatment for central sleep apnea differs in that the device is set not at one constant optimal pressure but rather at two different settings, one for inhalation (IPAP) and for exhalation (EPAP), maintaining normal breathing rhythm by inflating the patient's lungs at regular intervals whose specifics, such as the breathing rate and the duration of a single breath, can be programmed. Devices tailored to this purpose are known as BPAP ("bilevel positive airway pressure") devices.
- Both CPAP and BPAP devices can be connected to a humidifier to humidify and heat the inhaled air, thus reducing unpleasant symptoms such as a sore throat or blocked nose that can result from inhaling cold, dry air.
- CPAP and BPAP devices can trigger central apneas in those with obstructive sleep apnea, requiring the use of an ASV (adaptive servo ventilation) device, which is also the proper machine for those who have central sleep apnea or mixed/complex apnea.

== Epidemiology ==
Central sleep apnea is less prevalent than obstructive sleep apnea. In one study, CSA is stated to have a prevalence of 0.9% in comparison to OSA.

There are many factors that increase the risk of developing CSA. Chronic opioid use produces a mean prevalence in central sleep apnea development of 24%. An estimate of 10% of chronic kidney disease (CKD) patients have a CSA diagnosis. Cohort studies of stroke patients show a 70% development rate of CSA within 72 hours of the stroke event, although CSA was detected in less than 17% after 3 months of follow-up. Another cohort study from the Sleep Heart Healthy study showed the incidence of CSA in heart failure patients to be 0.9%.

=== Infancy ===
Central sleep apnea is common in preterm, newborn, and infancy stages but a decrease in risk is found with aging and maturity of the central nervous system. Underlying neurological disorders are the most common cause of CSA in full-term infants. Of the apnea-related events in preterm infants born at less than 29 weeks, 25% are central in origin.

=== Childhood ===
CSA is less common after 2 years of age. The prevalence of CSA in healthy children aged 10 to 18 years is 30%. Children with underlying medical conditions fall under a prevalence rate of 4-6%. For children diagnosed with Prader-Willi syndrome (PWS), CSA is more common and can occur in up to 53% of cases.

=== Adulthood ===
Research shows that rates of sleep apnea are higher in adults over the age of 65 years, due to older individuals having higher risks of developing CSA due to pre-existing medical conditions. Recorded prevalence in a cohort study of 2,911 men over the age of 65 was 7.5%. There is reduced risk of CSA in women, and a higher incidence in men. One study showed the incidence of CSA in men was 7.8% and 0.3% in women, stating a difference in hormones have an effect on the apneic threshold (AT) for apnea.

== See also ==
Central hypoventilation syndrome
