= Hypopnea =

Overly shallow breathing, decreased airflow into the lungs

Hypopnea is overly shallow breathing or an abnormally low respiratory rate. Hypopnea is typically defined by a decreased amount of air movement into the lungs and can cause hypoxemia (low levels of oxygen in the blood). It commonly is due to partial obstruction of the upper airway, but can also have neurological origins in central sleep apnea. (Or if a person has sleep apnea caused by both causes, it is variously referred to by a number of names, such as mixed sleep apnea or complex sleep apnea.)

Hypopnea is traditionally considered to be less severe than apnea (the complete cessation of breathing), while other researchers have discovered hypopnea to have a "similar if not indistinguishable impact" on the negative outcomes of sleep breathing disorders. In sleep clinics, obstructive sleep apnea syndrome or obstructive sleep apnea–hypopnea syndrome (as well as central sleep apnea) is normally diagnosed based on the frequent presence of apneas and/or hypopneas rather than differentiating between the two phenomena. The combined number of apnea and hypopnea events that occur on average per hour during sleep is noted using the Apnea–hypopnea index (AHI).

Hypopnea during sleep is classed as a sleep disorder. With moderate to severe hypopnea, sleep is disturbed such that patients may get a full night's sleep but still not feel rested. The disruption in breathing causes a drop in blood oxygen level, which may in turn disrupt the stages of sleep.

Daytime hypopnea events, however, are mostly limited to those with severely compromised respiratory muscles, as occurs in certain neuromuscular diseases or compromised central respiratory drive, as occurs in conditions such as acquired or congenital central hypoventilation syndrome (ACHS or CCHS). Daytime hypopnea can also cause a drop in blood oxygen level.

== Symptoms ==
The most common hypopnea symptom is excessive sleepiness, which results from constant sleep interruption. People with hypopnea due to airflow obstruction often have loud, heavy snoring that is interrupted with choking sounds or loud snorts followed by periods of silence, because not enough air can flow into the lungs through the mouth and nose. The periods of silence can last 20 seconds or longer and can happen many times each hour, resulting in poor sleep and reduced levels of oxygen in the blood.

Other symptoms of hypopnea may include depression, forgetfulness, mood or behaviour changes, trouble concentrating, loss of energy, nervousness, and morning headaches. Not all people with hypopnea experience all of these symptoms and not everyone with these symptoms has hypopnea.

=== Consequences ===
Hypopnea is a disorder that may result in excessive daytime sleepiness and compromised quality of life, including traffic accidents, diminished productivity in the workplace, and emotional problems.

Cardiovascular consequences of hypopnea may include myocardial infarction, hypertension, coronary heart disease, as well as other problems such as stroke, psychiatric problems, impotence, cognitive dysfunction and memory loss.

== Causes ==
Among the causes of hypopnea are:

- anatomical defects such as nasal septum deformation or congenital narrowness of nasal meatus and the gullet
- acute tonsillitis and/or adenoiditis
- obesity or being overweight
- neuromuscular disease or any condition that entails weakened respiratory muscles
- hypoventilation syndromes involving compromised or failed respiratory drive
- use of sedatives, for example sleeping pills
- hazardous alcohol use
- smoking
- aging
- others, most of which are also typical causes of airway obstruction, snoring and sleep apnea

== Diagnosis ==
In the context of diagnosis and treatment of sleep disorders, a hypopnea is not considered to be clinically significant unless there is a 30% or greater reduction in flow lasting for 10 seconds or longer and an associated 4% or greater desaturation in the person's O_{2} levels, or if it results in arousal or fragmentation of sleep.

The direct consequence of hypopnea (as well as apnea) is that the CO_{2} in the blood increases and the oxygen level in the patient's blood decreases in proportion to the severity of the airway obstruction. This disruptive pattern of breathing generates disruptive sleep patterns, the consequences of which being that those individuals may exhibit increased fatigability, lethargy, decreased ability to concentrate, increased irritability, and morning headaches. Basically, those individuals are extremely tired due to their inability to get a good night's sleep.

Hypopneas can be either central i.e., as part of a waxing and waning in breathing effort, or obstructive in origin. During an obstructive hypopnea, in comparison to an obstructive apnea, the airway is only partially closed. However, this closure is still enough to cause a physiological effect i.e., an oxygen desaturation and/or an increase in breathing effort terminating in arousal.

A Hypopnea Index (HI) can be calculated by dividing the number of hypopnea events during the sleep period by the number of hours of sleep. The Apnea-Hypopnea Index (AHI) is an index of severity that combines apneas and hypopneas. Combining them both gives an overall severity of sleep apnea including sleep disruptions and desaturations (a low level of oxygen in the blood). The apnea-hypopnea index, like the apnea index and hypopnea index, is calculated by dividing the number of apneas and hypopneas by the number of hours of sleep. Another index that is used to measure sleep apnea is the Respiratory Disturbance Index (RDI). The RDI is similar to the AHI, however, RDI also includes respiratory events that do not technically meet the definitions of apneas or hypopneas, such as a Respiratory Effort Related Arousal (RERA), but do disrupt sleep.

== Treatment ==
=== Obstructive hypopnea ===
One treatment for obstructive hypopnea is continuous positive airway pressure (CPAP). CPAP is a treatment in which the patient wears a mask over the nose and/or mouth. An air blower forces air through the upper airway. The air pressure is adjusted so that it is just enough to maintain the oxygen saturation levels in the blood.

Another treatment is sometimes a custom fitted oral appliance. The American Academy of Sleep Medicine's protocol for obstructive sleep apnea (OSA) recommends oral appliances for those who prefer them to CPAP and have mild to moderate sleep apnea or those that do not respond to/cannot wear a CPAP. Severe cases of OSA may be treated with an oral appliance if the patient has had a trial run with a CPAP. Oral appliances should be custom made by a dentist with training in dental sleep medicine.

Mild obstructive hypopnea can often be treated by losing weight or by avoiding sleeping on one's back. Also quitting smoking, and avoiding alcohol, sedatives and hypnotics (soporifics) before sleep can be quite effective. Surgery is generally a last resort in hypopnea treatment, but is a site-specific option for the upper airway. Depending on the cause of obstruction, surgery may focus on the soft palate, the uvula, tonsils, adenoids or the tongue. There are also more complex surgeries that are performed with the adjustment of other bone structures - the mouth, nose and facial bones.

=== Central hypopnea ===
People with neuromuscular disorders or hypoventilation syndromes involving failed respiratory drive experience central hypoventilation. The most common treatment for this form is the use of non-invasive ventilation such as a bilevel positive airway pressure (BPAP) machine.

== Etymology ==
The word hypopnea uses combining forms of hypo- + -pnea, from the Greek roots hypo- (meaning low, under, beneath, down, below normal) and pnoia (meaning breathing). See pronunciation information at dyspnea.

== See also ==
- List of terms of lung size and activity
- Bradypnea
