= Apnea–hypopnea index =

Index used to indicate the severity of sleep apnea

The Apnea–Hypopnea Index or Apnoea–Hypopnoea Index (AHI) is an index used to indicate the severity of sleep apnea. It is represented by the number of apnea and hypopnea events per hour of sleep. Apnea is the complete absence of airflow through the nose and mouth. Hypopnea is a partial collapse of the airway, limiting breathing. Apneas (pauses in breathing) must last for at least 10 seconds and be associated with a decrease in blood oxygenation to be considered. Combining AHI and oxygen desaturation gives an overall sleep apnea severity score that evaluates both the number of sleep breathing disruptions and the degree of oxygen desaturation (low oxygen level in the blood) during said disruptions.

The AHI is calculated by dividing the number of apnea events by the number of hours of sleep. The AHI values for adults are categorized as:

- Normal: AHI<5
- Mild sleep apnea: 5≤AHI<15
- Moderate sleep apnea: 15≤AHI<30
- Severe sleep apnea: AHI≥30

For children, because of their different physiology, an AHI in excess of 1 is considered abnormal. Underage pediatric patients presenting with AHI of 2 or greater will often be referred for treatment.

The Apnea-Hypopnea Index has been criticized for being too simplistic to accurately rate apnea and hypopnea events for their severity.

In one study, mean apnea-hypopnea duration and not AHI was found to be associated with worse hypertension.

== See also ==
- Obstructive sleep apnea
- Oxygen saturation (medicine)
- Respiratory disturbance index
