= Stanford Protocol =

- Specialty: Sleep medicine

The Stanford Protocol is a combination of surgeries that are undertaken to treat obstructive sleep apnea. The Protocol involves two phases, the first of which involves UPPP and one or more of Genioglossus Advancement or Hyoid suspension. The Second Phase of the operation involves maxillomandibular advancement.
