= Sleep surgery =

Medical intervention for sleep-related breathing disorders

- Other names: Sleep apnea surgery

Sleep surgery is a range of surgical procedures to treat sleep-related breathing disorders (sleep-disordered breathing), especially obstructive sleep apnea (OSA). The spectrum of sleep-related breathing disorders also includes primary snoring (non apneic snoring), upper airway resistance syndrome, and obesity hypoventilation syndrome. These surgeries are performed by surgeons trained in otolaryngology, oral maxillofacial surgery, and craniofacial surgery.

== Background ==
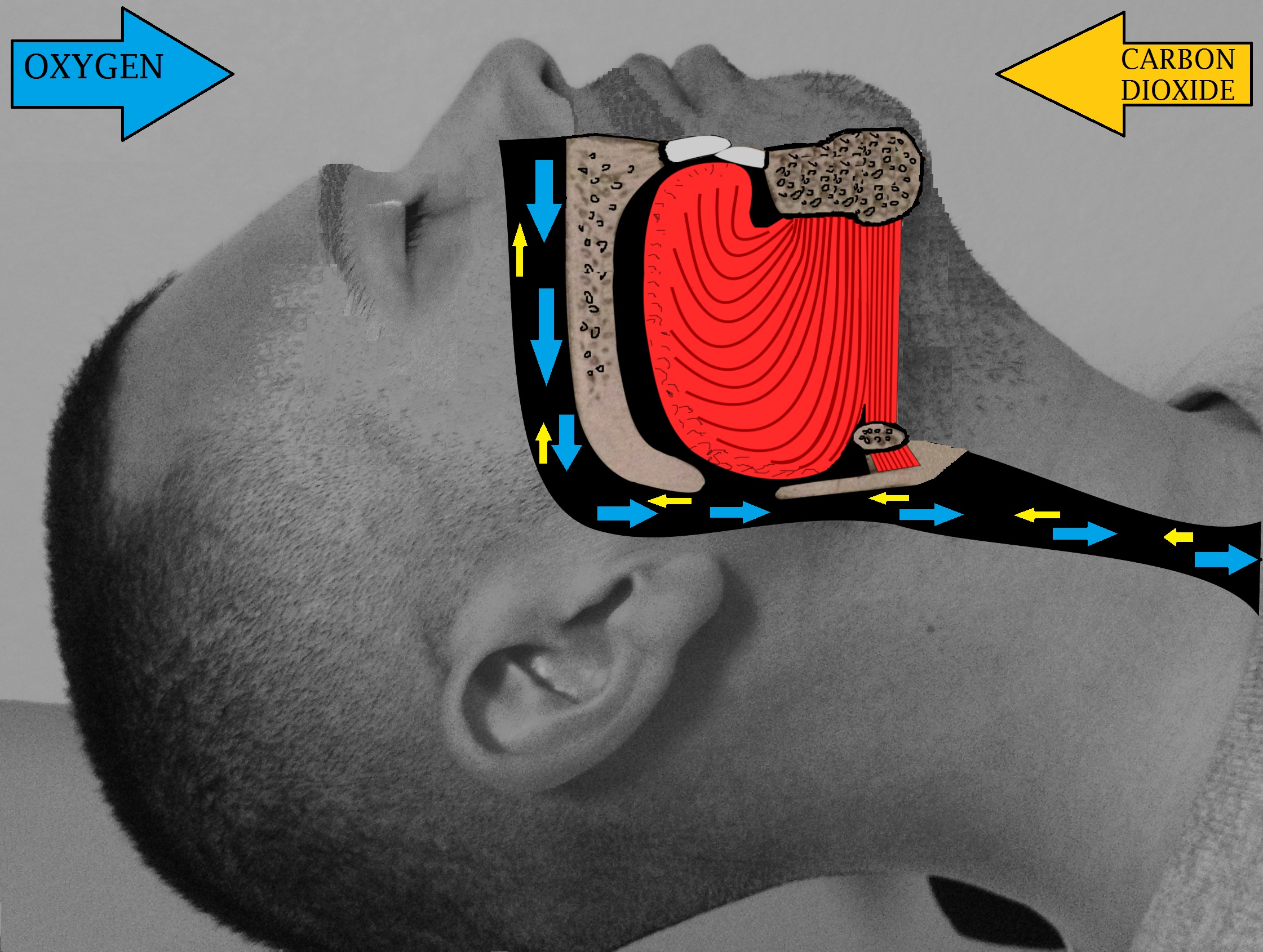
No airway obstruction during sleep

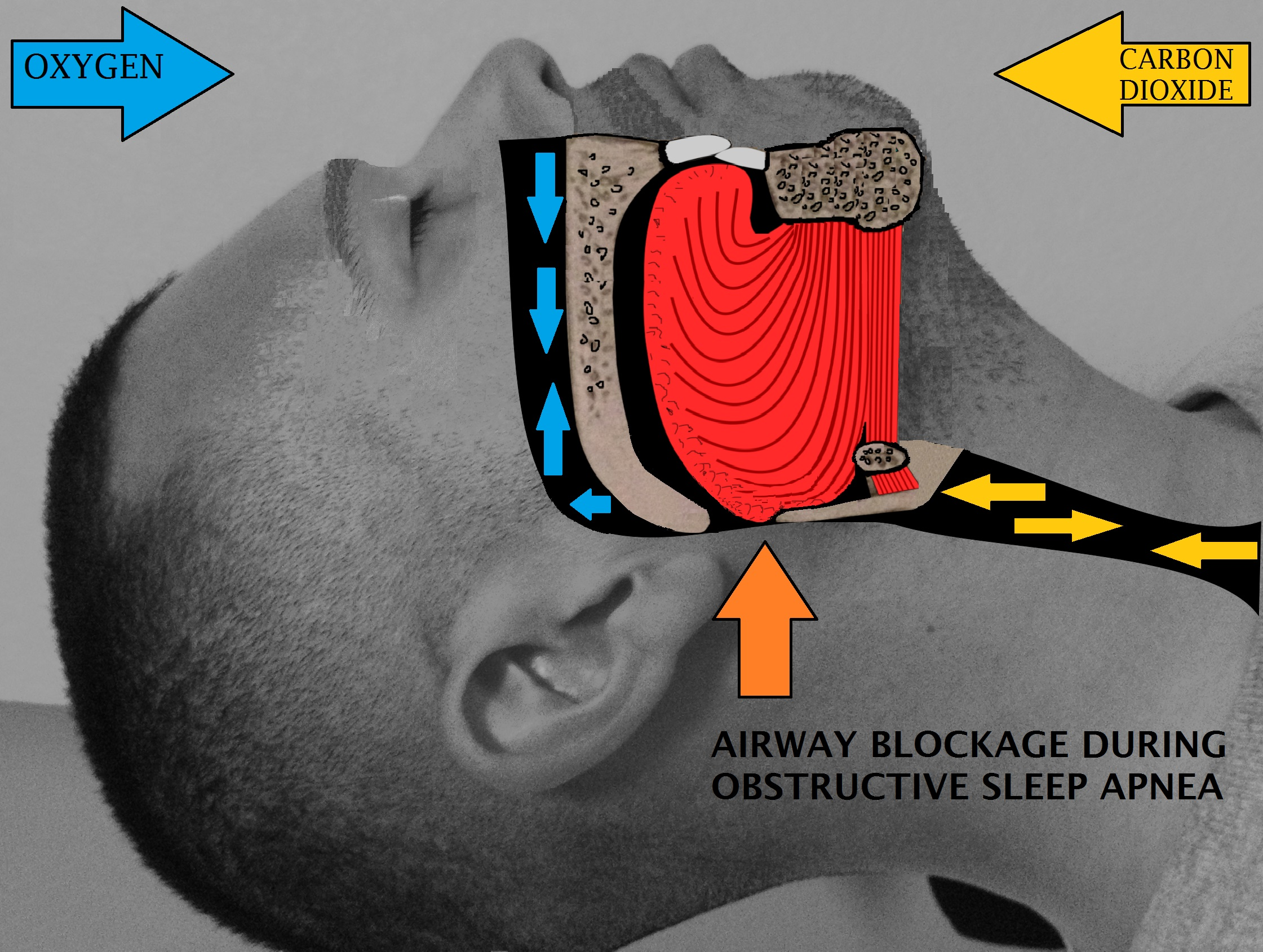
Airway obstruction during sleep

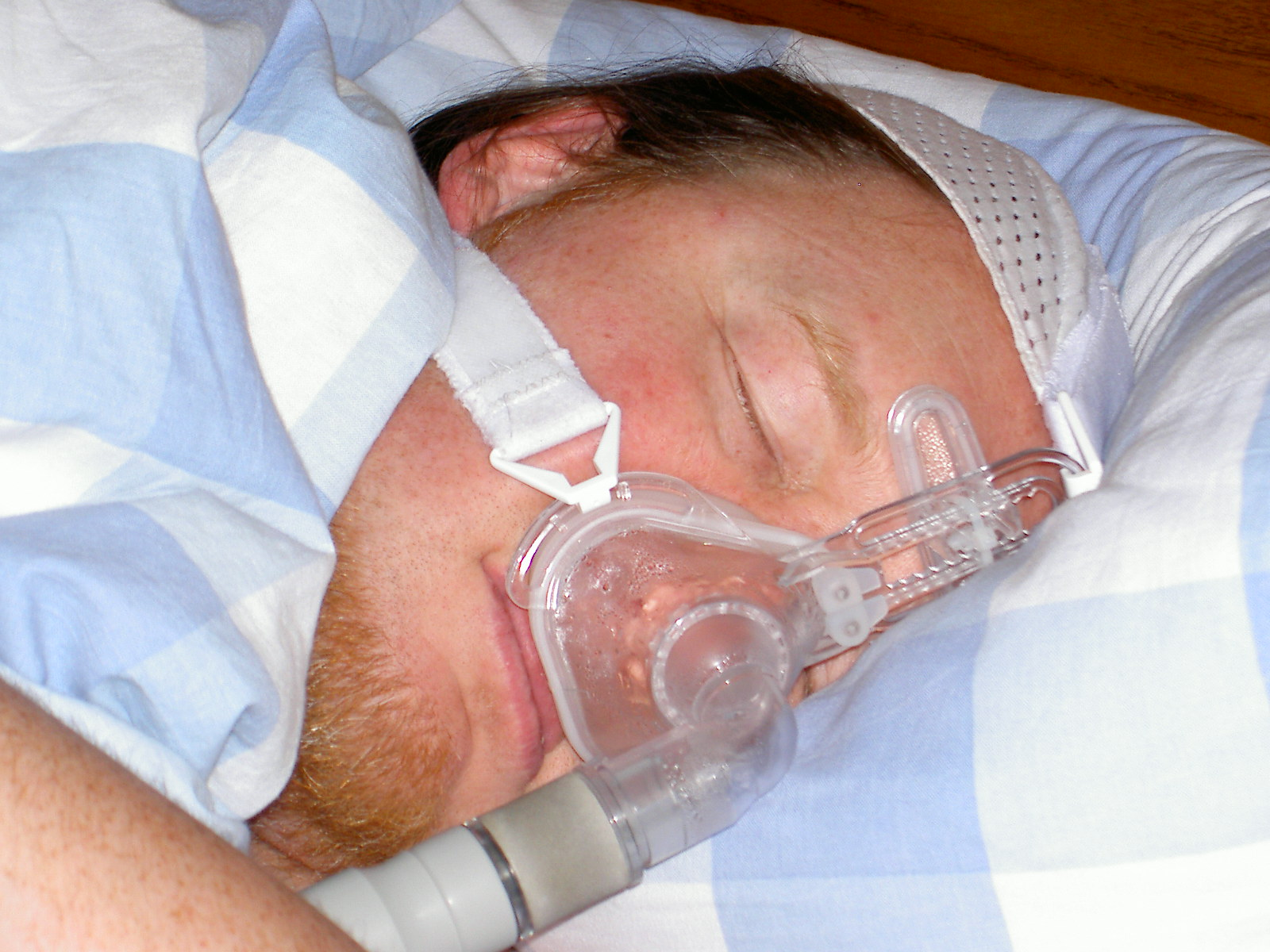
Patient using a CPAP machine. There are many models of CPAP face masks.

Obstructive sleep apnea (OSA) is defined as either cessation of breathing (apnea) for 10 seconds, or a decrease in normal breathing (hypopnea) with an associated desaturation in oxygen and arousal during sleep that lasts at least 10 seconds. In adults, it is typical to have up to 4.9 events per hour. In OSA, affected individuals are categorized based on how many apneas or hypopneas (apnea-hypopnea index or AHI) or events they have per hour.

- Normal: <5 events per hour
- Mild: 5 to <15 events per hour
- Moderate: 15 to 30 events per hour
- Severe: >30 events per hour

The prevalence of OSA (5 or more events/hr) is about 9% for women and 24% for men. Among sleepy patients in this group, 2% of women and 4% of men meet criteria for obstructive sleep apnea syndrome (OSAS). Those who snore habitually are more likely to have an AHI of 15 or more.

Non surgical treatments for sleep disordered breathing include continuous positive airway pressure (CPAP), mandibular advancement splints, and tongue retaining devices.

Sleep surgery aims to reduce daytime sleepiness, increase quality of life, and improve parameters recorded on polysomnography. In general, all the procedures achieve this by removing or preventing obstruction of the upper airway during sleep.

== Choice of procedure ==
Most people with OSA have multiple points of obstruction in their airway and therefore require multilevel sleep surgery in order to maximize the efficacy of treatment. Multilevel sleep surgery achieves a 60.3% AHI reduction. This reduction in sleep apnea severity via surgical means compares well against the AHI reduction for best case CPAP patients where an overall AHI reduction of 66% was achieved. Even single level surgical intervention in sleep apnea, which demonstrates a lesser degree of AHI reduction, shows a 31% survival benefit when compared against those using CPAP as therapy.

=== Tonsillectomy and/or adenoidectomy ===
Children with OSA typically have enlarged tonsils and adenoid tissue because the lymphoid tissue grows fast during young age. Surgical removal of enlarged tonsils (tonsillectomy) and the adenoid (adenoidectomy) or both (adenotonsillectomy) are first line treatment among children with OSA. Those less likely to benefit from adenotonsillectomy are obese children and those with other medical problems, such as Down syndrome. Sometimes a milder surgical procedure called tonsillotomy is used to remove the protruding tonsillar tissue instead of removing the tonsils entirely, a method associated with less pain and lower risk of postoperative hemorrhage.

Some adults with large tonsils may be candidates for having their tonsils and/or adenoids removed either alone or in combination with other procedures, such as uvulopalatopharyngoplasty (UPPP) or nasal surgery.

=== Uvulopalatopharyngoplasty (UPPP) ===
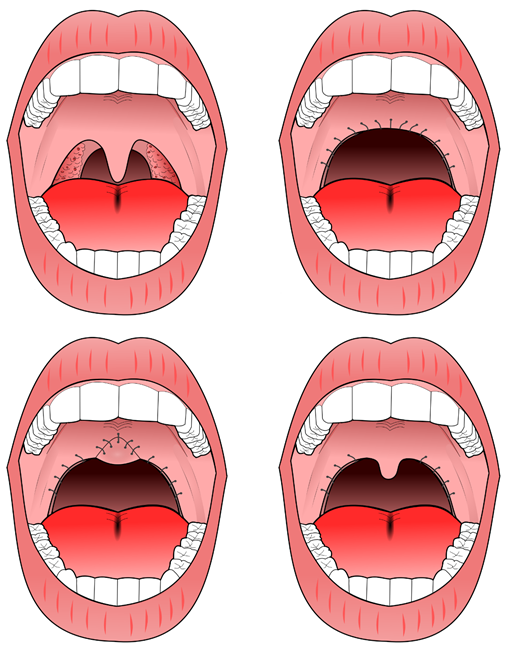
Uvulopalatopharyngoplasty. A) pre-operative, B) original UPPP, C) modified UPPP, and D) minimal UPPP.

The procedure most commonly performed for sleep apnea is the uvulopalatopharyngoplasty (UPPP). This involves removal of the tonsils if still present, and a subsequent palatal procedure. The tonsil pillars are often sutured closed—and the uvula is either trimmed, cut, folded, reshaped, or sutured to the soft palate. Studies have shown that treatment effect of UPPP with tonsillectomy increases with tonsil size.

Some procedures attempt to widen the airway by removing tissues in the back of the throat, including the uvula and pharynx. These surgeries are quite invasive, however, and there are risks of adverse side effects. The most dangerous risk is that enough scar tissue could form within the throat as a result of the incisions to make the airway more narrow than it was prior to surgery, diminishing the airspace in the velopharynx. Scarring is an individual trait, so it is difficult for a surgeon to predict how much a person might be predisposed to scarring. Currently, the American Medical Association does not approve of the use of lasers to perform operations on the pharynx or uvula.

=== Pillar procedure ===
The pillar procedure is a minimally invasive treatment for snoring and obstructive sleep apnea. In the United States, this procedure was approved by the FDA in 2004. During this procedure, three to six+ polyethylene terephthalate strips are inserted into the soft palate, using a modified syringe and local anesthetic. While the procedure was initially approved for the insertion of three "pillars" into the soft palate, it was found that there was a significant dosage response to more pillars, with appropriate candidates. As a result of this outpatient operation, which typically lasts no more than 30 minutes, the soft palate is more rigid, possibly reducing instances of sleep apnea and snoring. This procedure addresses one of the most common causes of snoring and sleep apnea—vibration or collapse of the soft palate (the soft part of the roof of the mouth). If there are other factors contributing to snoring or sleep apnea, such as conditions of the nasal airway or an enlarged tongue, it will likely need to be combined with other treatments to be more effective.

=== Radiofrequency ablation ===
Radiofrequency ablation (RFA), is a minimally invasive procedure using low frequency (300 kHz to 1 MHz) radio wave energy to target tissue (e.g. soft palate, uvula), causing coagulative necrosis. This causes scarring of the mucosa. After healing, this results in stiffening of the treated area. RFA achieves its effects at 40 °C to 70 °C unlike other electrosurgical devices which require 400 °C to 600 °C for efficacy.

RFA has some potential advantages in carefully selected medical settings, such as intolerance to the CPAP device. For example, when adherence is defined as greater than four hours of nightly use, 46% to 83% of patients with obstructive sleep apnea are non-adherent with CPAP for a variety of reasons, including discomfort while sleeping.

RFA is usually performed in an outpatient setting, using either local anesthetics or conscious sedation anesthesia, the procedure itself typically lasting under 1 hour. It is usually performed on an outpatient basis, and usually requires several treatment sessions. Radiofrequency ablation is frequently effective in reducing the severity of snoring, but often does not eliminate it.The targeted tissue, such as tongue or palate, is usually approached through the mouth without the need for incisions, although occasionally the target is approached through the neck using assisted imaging. If the tongue is being targeted, this can be done from either dorsal or ventral side. Complications include ulceration, infection, nerve weakness or numbness and swelling. These complications occur in less than 1% of procedures.

Bipolar radiofrequency ablation, a technique used for coblation tonsillectomy, is also used for the treatment of snoring.

=== Hyoid suspension ===
Hyoid suspension, also known as hyoid myotomy and suspension or hyoid advancement, is a surgical procedure in which the hyoid bone and its muscle attachments to the tongue and airway are pulled forward in order to increase airway size and improve airway stability behind and below the base of tongue (retrolingual and hypopharyngeal region).

=== Genioglossus advancement ===
Genioglossus advancement (GA) also known as genial tubercle advancement (GTA), is a procedure that pulls the base of the tongue forward, usually to increase airway size due to deformity or a sleep breathing disorder. This procedure is frequently performed with either uvulopalatopharyngoplasty or maxillomandibular advancement surgeries.

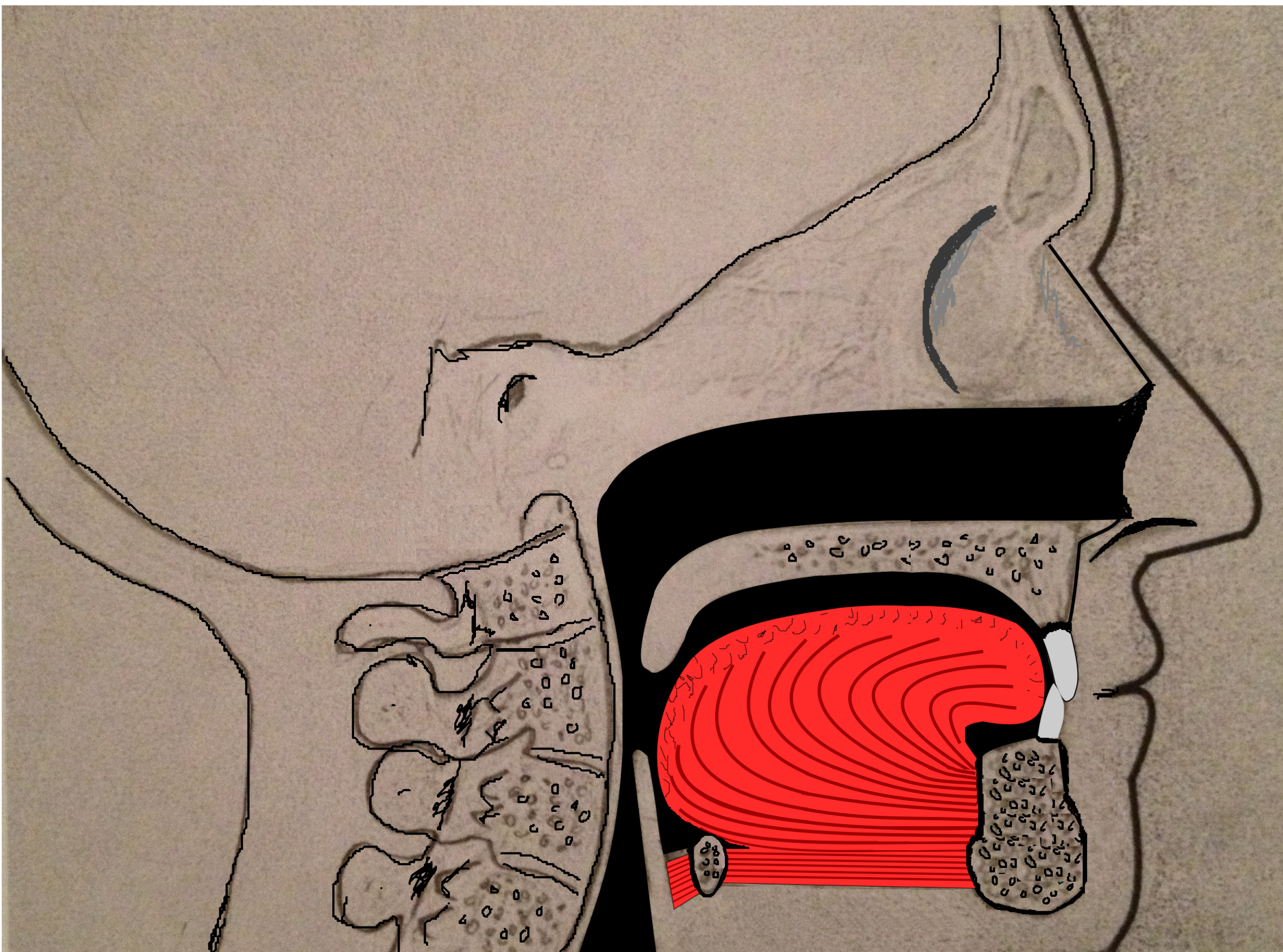
Airway before genioglossus advancement

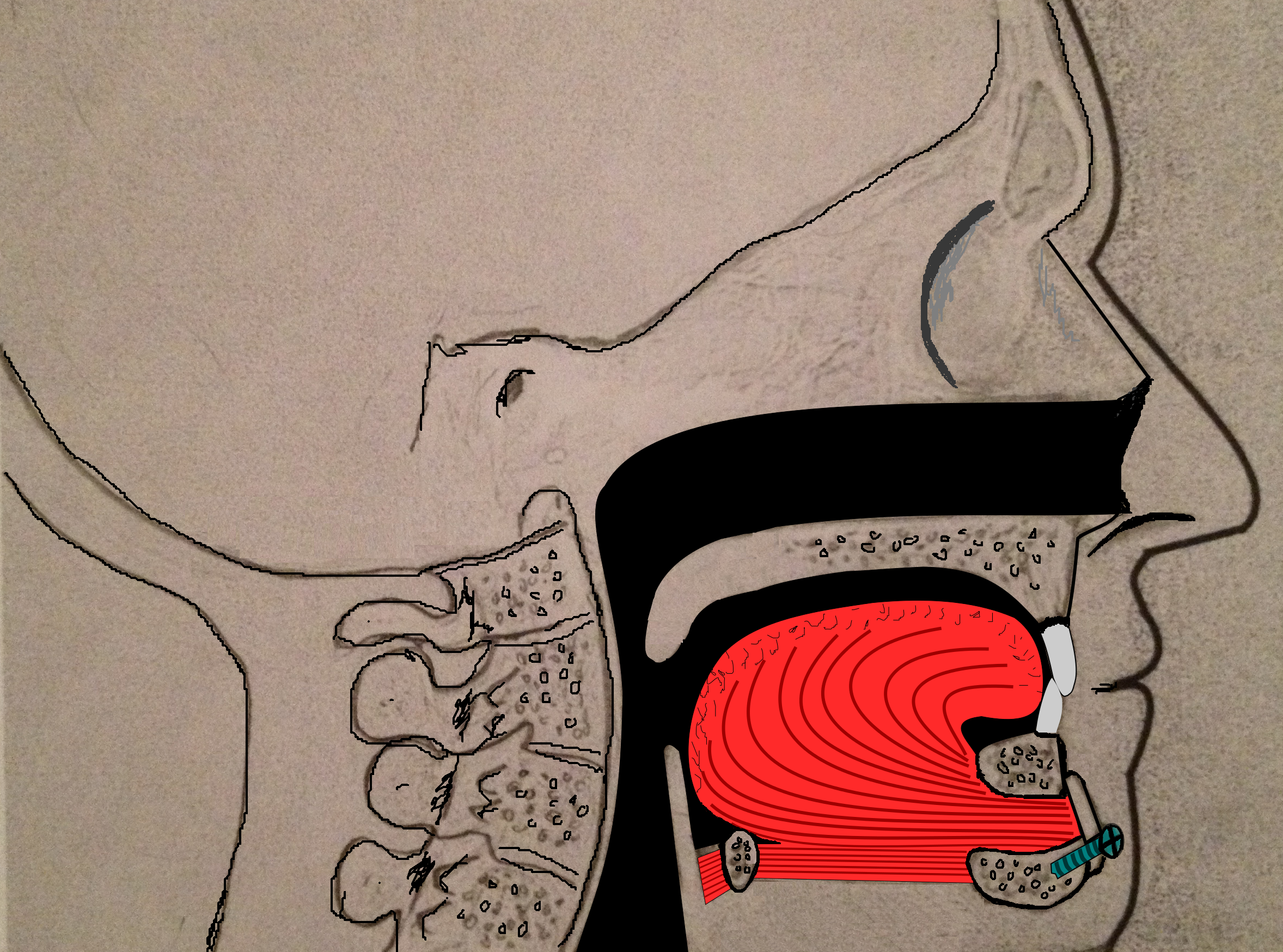
rightGenioglossus advancement after the surgery

Tongue muscles (genioglossus, geniohyoid and others) are attached to the lower jaw below the teeth. During a genioglossus advancement procedure, the surgeon cuts a small window or bone cut in the front part of the lower jaw (mandible) at the level of the geniotubercle where the genioglossus muscle attaches. This piece of bone, along with the attachment for the tongue (genial tubercle) is pulled forward and subsequently secured to the lower jaw, usually with a single screw or with a plate and screws.

This procedure is often combined with other surgeries such as uvulopalatopharyngoplasties or maxillomandibular advancement surgeries. It is rare to have this procedure performed as the only surgical treatment for sleep apnea, as obstruction in sleep apnea is most often at multiple levels (nose, palate, tongue, etc.).

=== Hypoglossal nerve stimulation ===
Hypoglossal nerve stimulation is a type of neuromodulation treatment which involves surgical implantation of a device which senses respiration and delivers mild electrical stimulation to the hypoglossal nerve in order to increase muscle tone at the back of the tongue so it will not collapse over the airway. The device includes a handheld patient controller to allow it to be switched on before sleep and is powered by an implantable pulse generator, similar to one used for cardiac rhythm management.

=== Maxillomandibular advancement ===
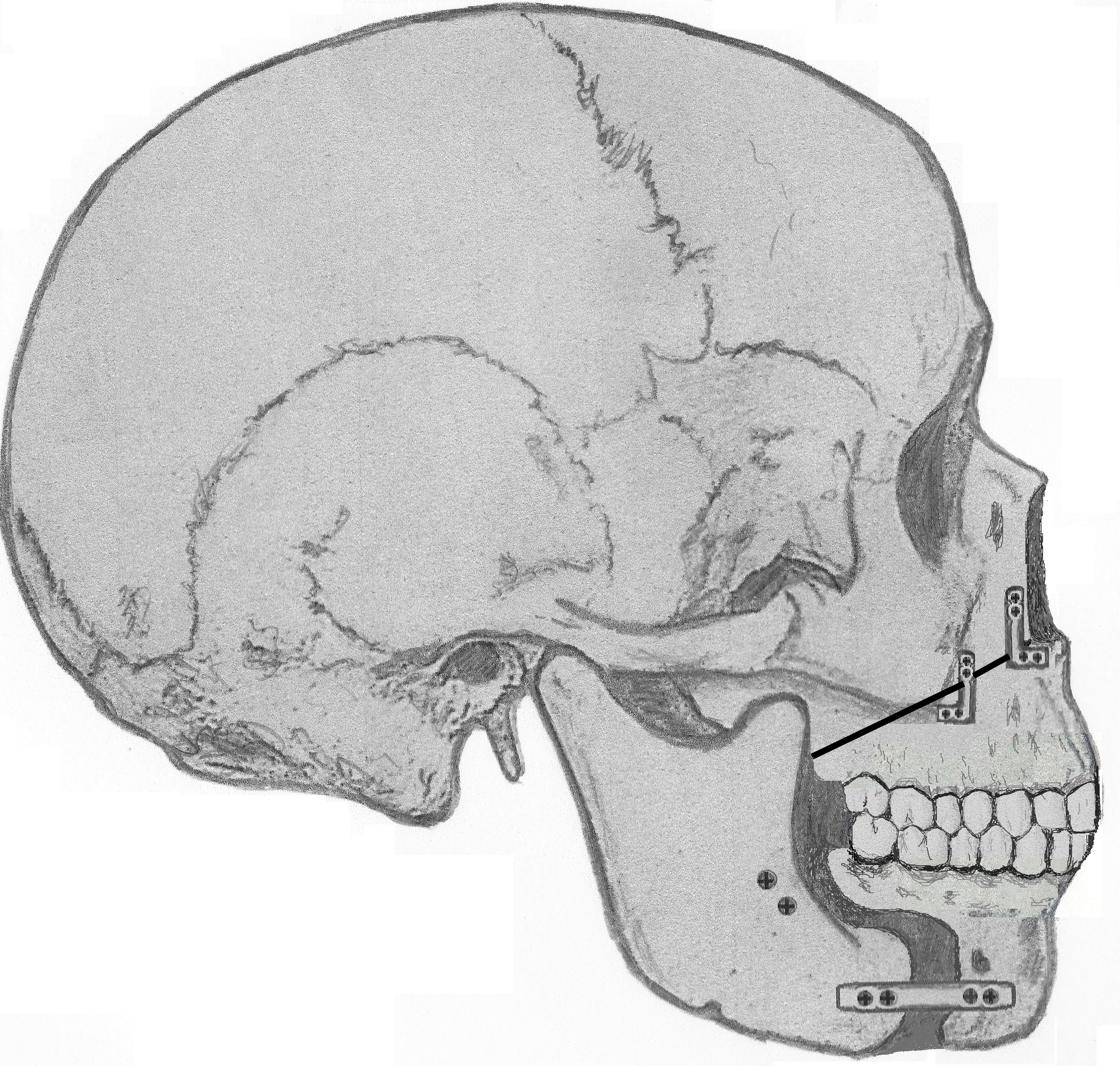
Maxillomadibular advancement

Maxillomandibular advancement (MMA) or orthognathic surgery, also sometimes called bimaxillary advancement (bi-max), or maxillomandibular osteotomy (MMO), is a procedure that moves the upper jaw (maxilla) and the lower jaw (mandible) forward. The procedure was first used to correct deformities of the facial skeleton, including malocclusion. In the late 1970s, advancement of the lower jaw (mandibular advancement) improved sleepiness in three patients. Subsequently, maxillomandibular advancement was used for patients with obstructive sleep apnea.

Currently, surgeons often perform maxillomandibular advancement surgery simultaneously with genioglossus advancement (tongue advancement). The genioglossus advancement pulls the tongue forward to decrease the amount of tongue blockage during sleep. MMA is one of the most effective surgical treatments for sleep apnea, with a high success rate. Nonetheless, the procedure is often used after other forms of treatment have failed (nasal surgeries, tonsillectomy, uvulopalatopharyngoplasty, tongue reduction surgeries). There is a longer recovery when compared to other sleep apnea surgeries, since the bones of the face have to heal into their new position.

=== Supraglottoplasty ===
A sub-group of children may have occult laryngomalacia, where the tissue directly above the vocal cords (epiglottis, arytenoids) collapses into the airway during sleep. These children may benefit from a supraglottoplasty to help prevent that tissue from collapsing into the airway.

=== Tracheostomy ===
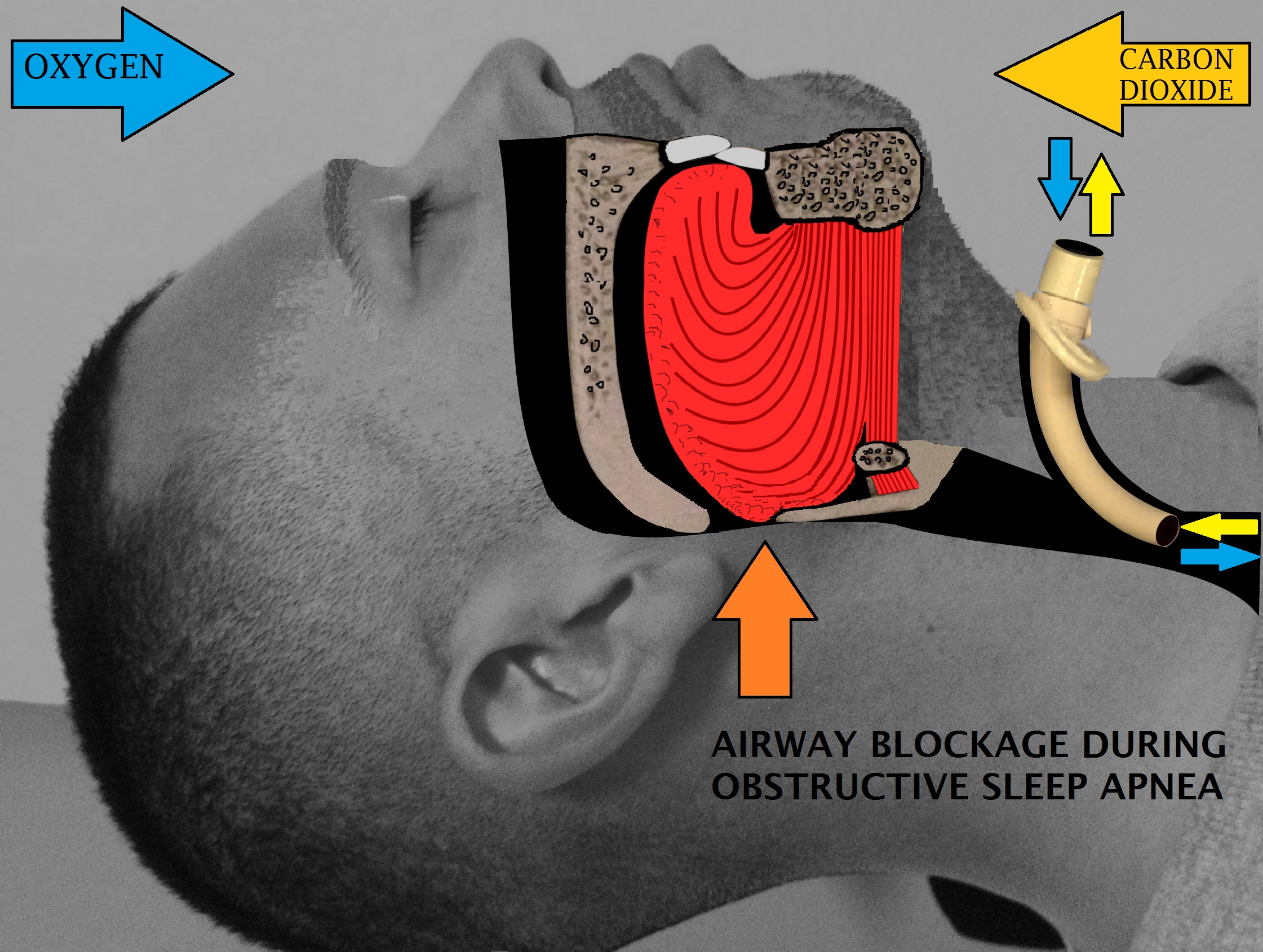
Tracheostomy, bypassing area of airway obstruction during sleep

Tracheostomy is the only surgical procedure that completely bypasses the upper airway. This procedure was commonly performed in the 1960-1980's for OSA, until other procedures were introduced as alternatives.

== History ==
In ancient Greece, surgical treatment of obstructive sleep apnea was crushing of uvula and removal of nasal polyps. During the Renaissance, Arabic physicians removed obstructing tissues in the upper airway using caustic methods and snares. Guillotine-like instruments were used until the 20th century to remove the uvula and the tonsils.

Tracheostomy was used to treat severe OSA in 1969. Adenoidectomy was introduced in 1978. Other sleep surgeries were developed after the 1970s, including palatal surgery, tongue base reductions, and maxillofacial surgeries.

In 1993 American doctors proposed the Stanford algorithm for surgical management of OSA. After identification of the obstruction site, phase 1 involved multilevel surgery (e.g., UPPP, mandibular osteotomy with genioglossus advancement, and/or hyoid suspension as required). After 6 months, patients were re-assessed. Those individuals who still had symptoms went to phase 2 which was maxillomandibular advancement. They reported 61% success at phase 1 and 100% success after phase 2. The latest developments in sleep surgery are hypoglossal nerve stimulation, procedures using radiofrequency, and procedures for nasal valve collapse.
