= Upper airway resistance syndrome =

Narrowing of the airway during sleep

- Other names: UARS, non-hypoxic sleep-disordered breathing

Upper airway resistance syndrome (UARS) is a sleep disorder characterized by the narrowing of the airway that can cause disruptions to sleep. The symptoms include snoring, unrefreshing sleep, nocturia, fatigue, sleepiness, chronic insomnia, and difficulty concentrating. UARS can be diagnosed by polysomnograms capable of detecting Respiratory Effort-related Arousals. It can be treated with lifestyle changes, functional orthodontics, surgery, mandibular repositioning devices or CPAP therapy. UARS is considered a variant of sleep apnea, although some scientists and doctors believe it to be a distinct disorder.

== History ==
Upper airway resistance syndrome was first recognized at Stanford University in the late 1980s. The article that described it by name, along with its relationship to obstructive sleep apnea (OSA), was published in 1992 by Guilleminault et al.

== Signs and symptoms ==
Symptoms of UARS are similar to those of obstructive sleep apnea, but not inherently overlapping. Fatigue, insomnia, daytime sleepiness, unrefreshing sleep, anxiety, and frequent awakenings during sleep are the most common symptoms. Oxygen desaturation is minimal or absent in UARS, with most having a minimum oxygen saturation >92%.

Many patients experience chronic insomnia that creates both a difficulty falling asleep and staying asleep. As a result, patients typically experience frequent sleep disruptions. Snoring is associated with UARS in most cases, but not always.

Some patients experience hypotension, which may cause lightheadedness, and patients with UARS are also more likely to experience headaches and irritable bowel syndrome.

Predisposing factors include a high and narrow hard palate, an abnormally small intermolar distance, an abnormal overjet greater than or equal to 3 millimeters, and a thin soft palatal mucosa with a short uvula. In 88% of the subjects, there is a history of early extraction or absence of wisdom teeth. There is an increased prevalence of UARS in east Asians.

== Pathophysiology ==
Upper airway resistance syndrome is caused when the upper airway narrows without closing. Consequently, airflow is either reduced or compensated for through an increase in inspiratory efforts. This increased activity in inspiratory muscles leads to the arousals during sleep which patients may or may not be aware of.

A typical UARS patient is not obese and possesses small jaws, which can result in a smaller amount of space in the nasal airway and behind the base of the tongue. Patients may have other anatomical abnormalities that can cause UARS such as deviated septum, inferior turbinate hypertrophy, a narrow hard palate that reduces nasal volume, enlarged tonsils, or nasal valve collapse. UARS affects equal numbers of males and females.

Why some patients with airway obstruction present with UARS and not OSA is thought to be caused by alterations in nerves located in the palatal mucosa. UARS patients have largely intact and responsive nerves, while OSA patients show clear impairment and nerve damage. Functioning nerves in the palatal mucosa allow UARS patients to more effectively detect and respond to flow limitations before apneas and hypopneas can occur. Patients with intact nerves are able to dilate the genioglossus muscle, a key compensatory mechanism utilized in the presence of airway obstruction. What damages the nerves is not definitively known, but it is hypothesized to be caused by the long term effects of gastroesophageal reflux and/or snoring.

== Diagnosis ==
UARS is diagnosed using the Respiratory Disturbance Index (RDI). A patient is considered to have UARS when they have an Apnea-Hypopnea Index (AHI) less than 5, but an RDI greater than or equal to 5. Unlike the Apnea-Hypopnea Index, the Respiratory Disturbance Index includes Respiratory Effort-related Arousals (RDI = AHI + RERA Index). In 2005, the definition of sleep apnea was changed to include patients with UARS by using RDI to determine sleep apnea severity.

The diagnosis of UARS is based on findings on a polysomnogram. On polysomnograms, a UARS patient will have very few apneas and hypopneas, but many Respiratory effort-related Arousals. Portable Home Sleep Test monitors (HST) are an alternative to sleep-laboratory polysomnography. Some of the HSTs allow for the breathing signals to be viewed within the raw data of the HST study and even a cursory review of these flow signals, will reveal those patients who would likely have upper airway resistance syndrome as well. RERAs are periods of increased respiratory effort lasting for more than ten seconds and ending in arousal. Whether or not an event is classified as a RERA or Hypopnea depends on the definition of Hypopnea used by the sleep technician. The American Academy of Sleep Medicine currently recognizes two definitions. The scoring of Respiratory Effort-related Arousals is currently designated as "optional" by the AASM. Thus, many patients who receive sleep studies may receive a negative result, even if they have UARS.

Based on symptoms, patients are commonly misdiagnosed with idiopathic insomnia, idiopathic hypersomnia, chronic fatigue syndrome, fibromyalgia, or a psychiatric disorder such as ADHD or depression. Studies have found that children with UARS are frequently misdiagnosed with ADHD. One study found UARS or OSA present in up to 56% of children with ADHD. Studies show that symptoms of ADHD caused by UARS significantly improve or remit with treatment in surgically treated children.

== Management ==
=== Behavioral modification ===
Behavioral modifications include getting at least 7–8 hours of sleep and various lifestyle changes, such as positional therapy. Sleeping on one's side rather than in a supine position or using positional pillows can provide relief, but these modifications may not be sufficient to treat more severe cases. Avoiding sedatives including alcohol and narcotics can help prevent the relaxation of airway muscles, and thereby reduce the chance of their collapse. Avoiding sedatives may also help to reduce snoring.

=== Medications ===
Nasal steroids may be prescribed in order to ease nasal allergies and other obstructive nasal conditions that could cause UARS.

=== Positive airway pressure therapy ===
If left untreated, UARS can develop into obstructive sleep apnea. Treatments for OSA such as positive airway pressure therapy can be effective at stopping the progression of UARS. Positive airway pressure therapy is similar to that in obstructive sleep apnea and works by stenting the airway open with pressure, thus reducing the airway resistance. Use of a CPAP can help ease the symptoms of UARS. Therapeutic trials have shown that using a CPAP with pressure between four and eight centimeters of water can help to reduce the number of arousals and improve sleepiness. CPAPs are the most promising treatment for UARS, but effectiveness is reduced by low patient compliance.

=== Oral appliances ===
Oral appliances to protrude the tongue and lower jaw forward have been used to reduce sleep apnea and snoring, and hold potential for treating UARS, but this approach remains controversial. Oral appliances may be a suitable alternative for patients who cannot tolerate CPAP.

=== Surgery ===
For nasal obstruction, options can be septoplasty, turbinate reductions, or surgical palate expansion.

Orthognathic surgeries that expand the airway, such as Maxillomandibular advancement (MMA) or Surgically Assisted Rapid Palatal Expansion (SARPE) are the most effective surgeries for sleep disordered breathing.

Though less common methods of treatment, various surgical options including uvulopalatopharyngoplasty (UPPP), hyoid suspension, and linguloplasty exist. These procedures increase the dimensions of the upper airway and reduce the collapsibility of the airway. One should also be screened for the presence of a hiatal hernia, which may result in abnormal pressure differentials in the esophagus, and in turn, constricted airways during sleep. Palatal tissue reduction via radiofrequency ablation has also been successful in treating UARS.

=== Maxillary expansion ===
Orthodontic treatment to expand the volume of the nasal airway, such as nonsurgical Rapid Palatal expansion is common in children. Due to the ossification of the median palatine suture, traditional tooth-born expanders cannot achieve maxillary expansion in adults as the mechanical forces instead tip the teeth and dental alveoli. Mini-implant assisted rapid palatal expansion (MARPE) has been recently developed as a minimally invasive option for the transverse expansion of the maxilla in adults. This method increases the volume of the nasal cavity and nasopharynx, leading to increased airflow and reduced respiratory arousals during sleep.

== See also ==
- Airway resistance
- Sleep apnea
- Laryngopharyngeal reflux, a possible cause
