= Christian Guilleminault =

French physician (1938–2019)

- Born: 1938; Marseille, France
- Died: 9 July 2019 (aged 80–81); Stanford, California
- Education: University of Paris (MD, PhD); University of Geneva
- Known for: Pioneer in modern sleep medicine research
- Scientific career
- Fields: Sleep medicine
- Workplaces: Stanford University School of Medicine

Christian Guilleminault (1938 – 9 July 2019) was a French physician and researcher in the field of sleep medicine who played a central role in the early discovery of obstructive sleep apnea and made seminal discoveries in many other areas of sleep medicine.

== Career ==
Born in 1938 in Marseille, France, he earned his medical degree and PhD at the University of Paris, and completed residencies in psychiatry and neurology in Paris and at the University of Geneva.

While working at the Stanford University Sleep Disorders Clinic in 1972 as a visiting assistant professor, Guilleminault became keenly interested in reports published by Italian sleep researcher Elio Lugaresi who had reported that nocturnal hypertension was present in patients who snored. Guilleminault persuaded cardiologists John Shroeder and Ara Tilkian to spend nights in the hospital's clinical research center monitoring the systemic and pulmonary arterial blood pressure in sleeping patients. The team observed that when patients fell asleep and began snoring, prolonged pauses in their breathing (apneas) were noted that corresponded with dramatic elevations in their resting blood pressure, simulating strenuous exercise as if the patient were lifting weights. Guilleminault then went on to publish several articles illustrating dramatic improvements and reversal of sleep apnea following tracheostomies. Tracheostomy proved curative in these patients, and demonstrated reversal of cardiac arrhythmias and blood pressure abnormalities during sleep; temporarily capping these artificial airways would re-capitulate the changes of sleep apnea, further establishing the causative relationship between sleep apnea and cardiovascular abnormalities.

Guilleminault then went on to describe obstructive sleep apnea in non-obese patients, being the first to coin the term "obstructive sleep apnea syndrome" (OSAS), a term commonly used nowadays. In addition, he described the presence of OSAS in children, demonstrating its association with learning and attention problems along with cardiovascular derangements. Following this work, he went on to describe the presence of elevated upper airway resistance in children in 1982, emphasizing the symptoms of attention deficit, hyperactivity, and abnormal behavior during wakefulness and sleep, learning disabilities and sleepwalking, sleep terrors and enuresis that accompanied this form of sleep-related breathing disorder; he described the same syndrome in adults and penned the term "upper airway resistance syndrome" (UARS) in adults. Finally, working in collaboration with Dr. William C. Dement, Guilleminault established the Apnea–hypopnea index (AHI), which is still in use today to characterize the presence and severity of sleep apnea.

Guilleminault continued to be a prolific researcher in the field of sleep medicine until his death. He authored over seven hundred and forty (743) articles in peer-reviewed medical journals and won several awards for his research in the field of sleep medicine. He was a founding member of the Association of Sleep Disorders Centers in 1975 and was elected as the first editor of the journal Sleep in June 1976, a role in which he continued to serve until 1997.

== Personal life ==
He was married to Priscilla Grevert with two sons, Eric and Damian Guilleminault.

== Death ==
He died on 9 July 2019, from complications related to metastatic prostate cancer.

== Books ==
- Sleep Medicine, An Issue of Medical Clinics of North America (2010)
- Sleepiness, An Issue of Sleep Medicine Clinics (2006)
- Clinical Neurophysiology of Sleep Disorders: Handbook of Clinical Neurophysiology Series (2005)
- Fatal Familial Insomnia: Inherited Prion Diseases, Sleep and the Thalamus (1994)
- Obstructive Sleep Apnea Syndrome: Clinical Research and Syndrome (1990)
- Sleep and its Disorders in Children (1987)
- Sleeping and Waking Disorders: Indications and Techniques (1982)
- Progress in Perinatal Neurology (1981)
- Advances in Perinatal Neurology (1979)

== Selected awards and honors ==
- Doctor "Honoris Causa", University of Liege (School of Medicine) (Belgium) (2004)
- Distinguished Scientist Award, Sleep Research Society (2005)
- Honorary professor, Department of Oto-laryngology, Medical Sciences School of the Capital University, Beijing, China (2005)
- Life Achievement Award, National Sleep Foundation (2005)
- Doctor "Honoris Causa", Universite de Montreal (Canada) (2013)
