= ASAA =

Asaa is a small town in northern Jutland, Denmark.

ASAA may refer to:

- Alaska School Activities Association
- Alberta Schools Athletic Association
- American Sleep Apnea Association
- Asian Studies Association of Australia
