= UARS =

UARS may refer to:

- Upper Atmosphere Research Satellite, an orbital observatory whose mission was to study the Earth's atmosphere, particularly the protective ozone layer, and which crashed on Earth in 2011
- Upper airway resistance syndrome, a sleep disorder characterized by airway resistance to breathing during sleep
