= Hyoid suspension =

Surgical procedure

Hyoid suspension, also known as hyoid myotomy and suspension or hyoid advancement, is a surgical procedure or sleep surgery in which the hyoid bone and its muscle attachments to the tongue and airway are pulled forward with the aim of increasing airway size and improving airway stability in the retrolingual and hypopharyngeal airway (airway behind and below the base of tongue). The horseshoe shaped hyoid bone sits directly below the base of tongue with the arms of the bone flanking the airway. Hyoid suspension is typically performed as a treatment for obstructive sleep apnea (OSA). This procedure is frequently performed with a uvulopalatopharyngoplasty (UPPP) which targets sites of obstruction higher in the airway. Typically, a hyoid suspension is considered successful when the patient's apnea-hypopnea index is significantly reduced after surgery.

== Background ==
The American Academy of Otolaryngology–Head and Neck Surgery position statement considers hyoid suspension "effective and non-investigational with proven clinical results when considered as part of the comprehensive surgical management of symptomatic adult patients with mild obstructive sleep apnea (OSA) and adult patients with moderate and severe OSA assessed as having tongue base or hypopharyngeal obstruction."

The American Sleep Apnea Association (ASAA) website describes hyoid suspension as a minimally invasive procedure where: "Success from this procedure has been outstanding and is becoming a valuable tool in the surgeon's armamentarium."

Hyo-mandibular advancement along with genioglossus advancement was originally described by in 1984. Published clinical experience with hyoid suspension can be summarized into three different approaches to the hyoid suspension procedure: hyo-mandibular suspension, hyo-thyroid suspension, and genioglossus advancement and hyoid myotomy.

== Hyo-mandibular suspension ==
In hyo-mandibular suspension, sutures are looped around the anterior section of the hyoid bone, the hyoid is advanced typically 2–3 centimeters (until the muscle attachments to the hyoid are tensioned) using the sutures, and the hyoid advancement is locked into place and secured via bone anchors on the front lower inside portion of the jaw. This procedure is typically performed with two incisions, one incision under the chin for placement of bone anchors into the jaw and one incision directly over the hyoid bone for the most direct access to the bone. Some surgeons perform the procedure from only the single incision below the chin. Potential complications and side effects from the procedure include neck seromas, edema, and surgical site infection.

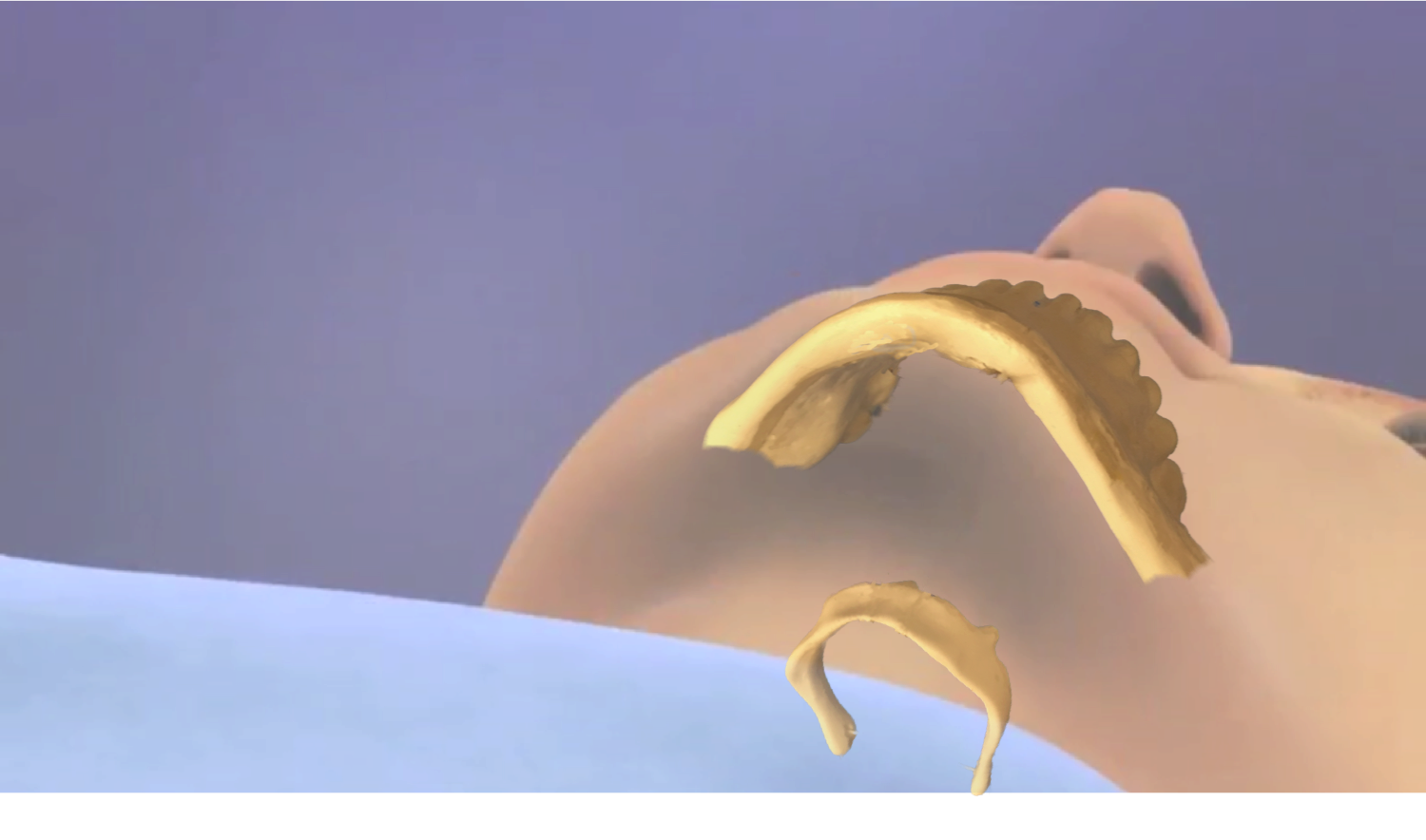
Hyo-mandibular suspension: Base hyoid position before advancement.

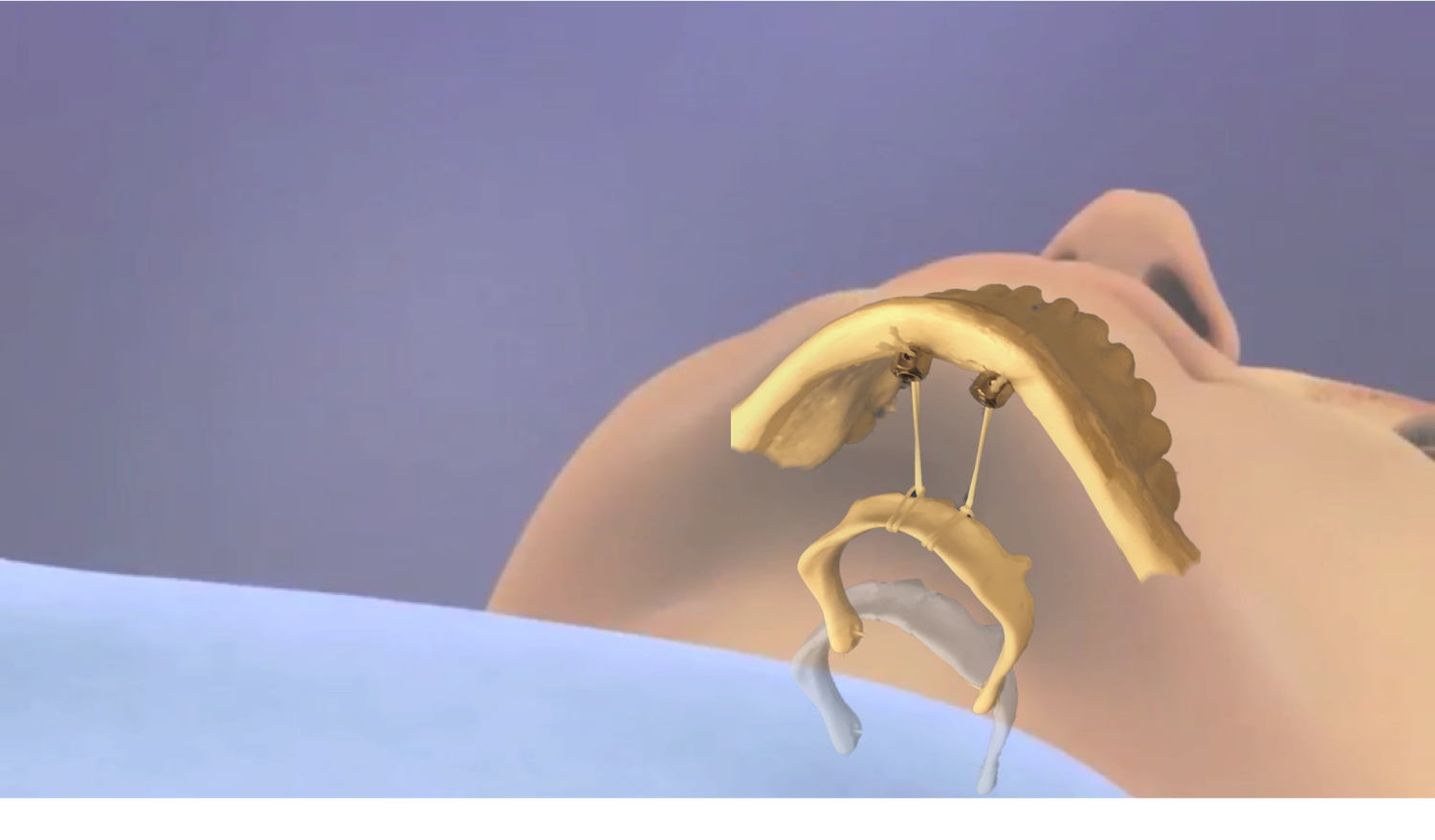
Hyo-mandibular suspension: Hyoid advanced with ghost image of original hyoid position. Shown using Encore hyoid system by Siesta Medical.

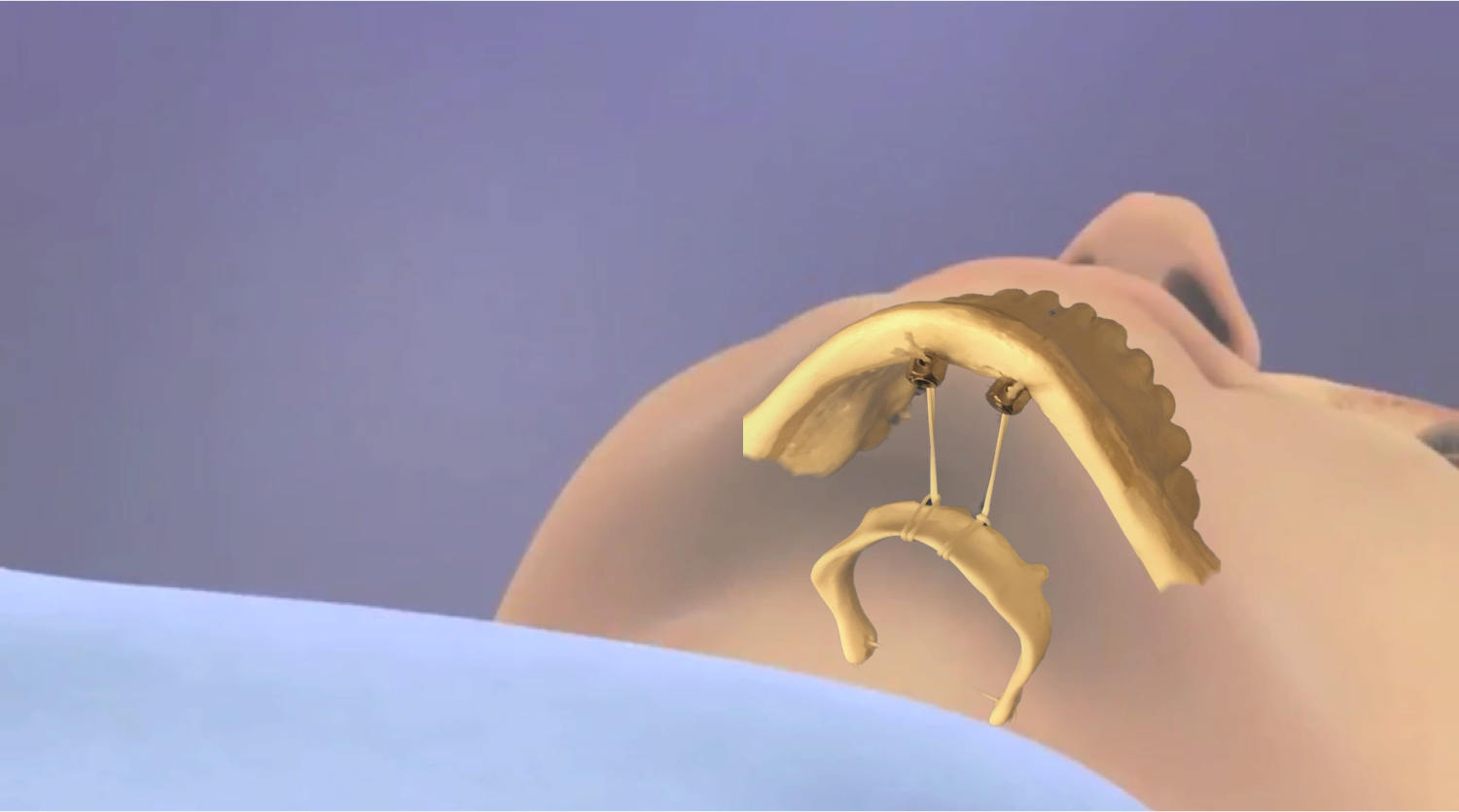
Hyo-mandibular suspension: Completed suspension.

== Hyo-thyroid suspension ==
In hyo-thyroid suspension, sutures are looped around the hyoid, and the hyoid bone is advanced using the sutures to the upper edge of the thyroid cartilage where it is sutured and tied to the top of the thyroid cartilage. This procedure is typically performed from a single incision directly over the hyoid bone. Potential complications and side effects from the procedure include neck seromas, edema, transient dysphagia, and surgical site infection.

== Genioglossus advancement and hyoid myotomy (GAHM) ==
In genioglossus advancement and hyoid myotomy (GAHM), a genioglossus advancement is performed at the same time as either a hyo-mandibular or hyo-thyroid suspension. Potential complications and side effects from the procedure include lip and chin hypoanesthesia, seromas, edema, transient dysphagia and aspiration, and surgical site infection.

== Clinical results ==
Published clinical results for hyoid suspension performed with a UPPP are presented in the table below. Surgical success typically means that the AHI is reduced at least 50% and that the post-operative AHI is less than 20.

	Hyo-mandibular suspension	Hyo-thyroid suspension	GAHM
AHI improvement	60%	48%	58%
Surgical success	71%	58%	61%

Published clinical information for the three hyoid suspension variations without a UPPP is very limited.

For many years, a genioglossus advancement was consistently performed with a hyoid suspension where the more invasive and morbid genioglossus advancement was considered a necessary component for the overall success of the tongue base intervention. Hyo-thyroid suspension published evidence comes entirely from Europe where the low cost, reduced morbidity, and nearly equivalent results to GAHM have made it the preferred technique. Recent publications have suggested that hyo-mandibular suspension may be the most effective hyoid suspension technique in treating tongue base and hypopharyngeal obstructions. The technique is similarly invasive to hyo-thyroid suspension and available clinical data shows 25% greater efficacy for the reduction of AHI when compared to hyo-thyroid suspension. Data available for hyo-mandibular suspension also shows similar superior efficacy to the GAHM procedure. Hyo-mandibular suspension requires a surgical kit and implants (Siesta Medical Encore or Medtronic Airvance) which make the procedure marginally more expensive than hyo-thyroid suspension.
