= Airway resistance =

Resistance of the respiratory tract to airflow

In respiratory physiology, airway resistance is the resistance of the respiratory tract to airflow during inhalation and exhalation. Airway resistance can be measured using plethysmography.

== Definition ==
Analogously to Ohm's law:

$$R_{AW} = \frac {{\Delta}P}{\dot V}$$

Where:

$${\Delta P} = P_{ATM} - P_A$$

So:

$$R_{AW} = \frac {P_{\mathrm{ATM}} - P_{\mathrm{A}}}{\dot V}$$

Where:

- $R_{AW}$ = Airway Resistance
- ${\Delta}P$ = Pressure Difference driving airflow
- $P_{ATM}$ = Atmospheric Pressure
- $P_A$ = Alveolar Pressure
- $\dot V$ = Volumetric Airflow (not minute ventilation which, confusingly, may be represented by the same symbol)

N.B. P_{A} and $\dot V$ change constantly during the respiratory cycle.

== Determinants of airway resistance ==
There are several important determinants of airway resistance including:

- The diameter of the airways
- Whether airflow is laminar or turbulent

=== Hagen–Poiseuille equation ===
In fluid dynamics, the Hagen–Poiseuille equation is a physical law that gives the pressure drop in a fluid flowing through a long cylindrical pipe. The assumptions of the equation are that the flow is laminar viscous and incompressible and the flow is through a constant circular cross-section that is substantially longer than its diameter. The equation is also known as the Hagen–Poiseuille law, Poiseuille law and Poiseuille equation.

$${\Delta P} = \frac{8 \eta l {\dot V}}{ \pi r^4}$$

Where:

- $\Delta P$ = Pressure difference between the ends of the pipe
- $l$ = Length of pipe
- $\eta$ = the dynamic viscosity
- $\dot V$ = the volumetric flow rate (Q is usually used in fluid dynamics, however in respiratory physiology it denotes cardiac output)
- $r$ = the radius of the pipe

Dividing both sides by $\dot V$ and given the above definition shows:-

$$R = \frac{8 \eta l}{\pi r^{4}}$$

While the assumptions of the Hagen–Poiseuille equation are not strictly true of the respiratory tract it serves to show that, because of the fourth power, relatively small changes in the radius of the airways causes large changes in airway resistance.

An individual small airway has much greater resistance than a large airway, however there are many more small airways than large ones. Therefore, resistance is greatest at the bronchi of intermediate size, in between the fourth and eighth bifurcation.

=== Laminar flow versus turbulent flow ===
Where air is flowing in a laminar manner it has less resistance than when it is flowing in a turbulent manner. If flow becomes turbulent, and the pressure difference is increased to maintain flow, this response itself increases resistance. This means that a large increase in pressure difference is required to maintain flow if it becomes turbulent.

Whether flow is laminar or turbulent is complicated, however generally flow within a pipe will be laminar as long as the Reynolds number is less than 2300.

$$Re = {{\rho {\mathrm v} d} \over \mu}$$

where:

- $Re$ is the Reynolds number
- $d$ is the diameter of the pipe.
- ${\mathbf \mathrm v}$ is the mean velocity.
- ${\mu}$ is the dynamic viscosity.
- ${\rho}\,$ is the density.

This shows that larger airways are more prone to turbulent flow than smaller airways. In cases of upper airway obstruction the development of turbulent flow is a very important mechanism of increased airway resistance, this can be treated by administering Heliox, a breathing gas which is much less dense than air and consequently more conductive to laminar flow.

== Changes in airway resistance ==
Airway resistance is not constant. As shown above airway resistance is markedly affected by changes in the diameter of the airways. Therefore, diseases affecting the respiratory tract can increase airway resistance. Airway resistance can also change over time. During an asthma attack the airways constrict causing an increase in airway resistance. Airway resistance can also vary between inspiration and expiration: In emphysema there is destruction of the elastic tissue of the lungs which help hold the small airways open. Therefore, during expiration, particularly forced expiration, these airways may collapse causing increased airway resistance.

== Derived parameters ==
=== Airway conductance (G_{AW}) ===
This is simply the mathematical inverse of airway resistance.

$$G_{AW} = \frac{1}{R_{AW}}$$

=== Specific airway resistance (sR_{aw}) ===
$$sR_{AW} = {R_{AW}}{V}$$

Where V is the lung volume at which R_{AW} was measured.

Also called volumic airway resistance. Due to the elastic nature of the tissue that supports the small airways airway resistance changes with lung volume. It is not practically possible to measure airway resistance at a set absolute lung volume, therefore specific airway resistance attempts to correct for differences in lung volume at which different measurements of airway resistance were made.

Specific airway resistance is often measured at FRC, in which case:

$$sR_{AW} = {R_{AW}}\times{FRC}$$

=== Specific airway conductance (sG_{aw}) ===
$$sG_{AW} = \frac{G_{AW}}{V} = \frac{1}{R_{AW}V} = \frac{1}{sR_{AW}}$$

Where V is the lung volume at which G_{AW} was measured.

Also called volumic airway conductance. Similarly to specific airway resistance, specific airway conductance attempts to correct for differences in lung volume.

Specific airway conductance is often measured at FRC, in which case:

$$sG_{AW} = \frac{G_{AW}}{FRC}$$

== See also ==
- Turbulent flow
- Laminar flow
- Reynolds number
- Upper airway resistance syndrome (UARS)
