= Clinical research center =

Medical facility used to conduct clinical research

The term "Clinical research center" (CRC) or "General clinical research center" (GCRC) refers to any designated medical facility used to conduct clinical research, such as at a hospital or medical clinic. They have been used to perform clinical trials of various medical procedures. The medical profession has had specific uses for CRC facilities, including awarding grants to support various types of research.

For example, the U.S. National Institutes of Health had, for years, issued GCRC grants, but later changed to awarding a Clinical and Translational Science Award (CTSA). Many hospitals or clinics have included a wing, ward, or other area titled as "Clinical Research Center" (with capitalized words).

== Example facilities ==
Some examples of CRC facilities are:

- Harvard-Thorndike General Clinical Research Center in Massachusetts.
- Mallinckrodt General Clinical Research Center in Massachusetts.
- Mark O. Hatfield Clinical Research Center in Maryland.
- UCLA General Clinical Research Center in California.
