= Sleep-related breathing disorder =

Abnormality in breathing during sleep

An SRBD (short for sleep-related breathing disorder) is a sleep disorder in which abnormalities in breathing occur during sleep which may or may not be present while awake. According to the International Classification of Sleep Disorders, sleep-related breathing disorders are classified as follows:

- Sleep apnea, including the more specific disorders of obstructive sleep apnea and central sleep apnea
- Central hypoventilation syndrome
- Obesity hypoventilation syndrome
- Sleep-related hypoxemia disorder
- Sleep-related hypoventilation due to a medication or substance, or due to a medical disorder
- Isolated symptoms produced by breathing during sleep, including snoring and catathrenia

There are many different surgical procedures for sleep-related breathing disorders, sometimes collectively termed "sleep surgery".

== Severity of sleep apneas ==
The most severe of the sleep apneas is obstructive sleep apnea. Apnea is obstructive only when polysomnography reveals a continued inspiratory effort, evidenced by abdominal and thoracic muscle contraction. Sleep apnea is measured by the apnea-hypopnea index (AHI). An AHI is determined with a sleep study.

AHI values for adults are categorized as:

- Normal: AHI<5
- Mild sleep apnea: 5≤AHI<15
- Moderate sleep apnea: 15≤AHI<30
- Severe sleep apnea: AHI≥30

An episode is when a person hesitates to breathe or stops their breathing altogether.

== Treatments of sleep apnea ==
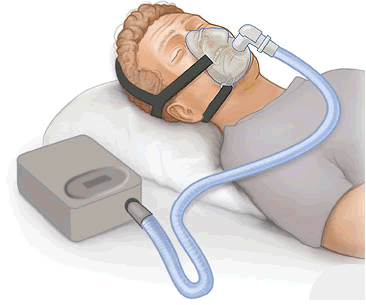
Sketch of patient with CPAP machine

The most common treatment for sleep apnea is the use of continuous positive airway pressure with a CPAP machine. A CPAP machine pushes air through the nose and/or mouth, which applies air pressure to keep the throat open while asleep. This prevents pauses in breathing. This is helpful in the sense of people with more severe sleep apnea related problems. This CPAP machine is usually the first line of treatment and one of the most effective ways to treat the disease. This machine can help with the quality of sleep someone receives when using it and also lowering their blood pressure and other medical-related problems one might have when being diagnosed with this disease.

Other forms of treatment to consider are oral appliances. An oral appliance helps keep the jaw forward and the tongue relaxed. There are a number of surgical treatments available. There are many surgical procedures for sleep apnea. The most common of these is called a uvulopalatopharyngoplasty (UPPP). One can also consult their doctors about losing some weight which can also help in most cases.

== Central hypoventilation syndrome ==
"Central hypoventilation syndrome, sometimes referred to as Ondine's curse, is an inability of the brain to detect changes in carbon dioxide levels in the body during sleep. The human body determines the amount of oxygen it needs by monitoring how much carbon dioxide is in the blood." Central hypoventilation syndrome is caused by certain receptors in the brain failing to recognize changes in carbon dioxide levels during sleep, leading to a low breathing rate and low blood concentration of oxygen. Some of the causes of this disease are sudden onset obesity or spinal cord surgery. This is one of the least common sleep disorders and has the least amount of research done for it.

== Treatments of central hypoventilation syndrome ==
The treatment for central hypoventilation syndrome involves breathing support during sleep, often through the assistance of a mechanical ventilator. In some cases, this type of breathing support may be necessary during waking hours as well. Often referred to as oxygen therapy, it can use a CPAP machine as well. Again weight loss is a big help as well and listed as one of the top ways to get rid of the problem.
