= Maxillomandibular advancement =

Type of jaw surgery

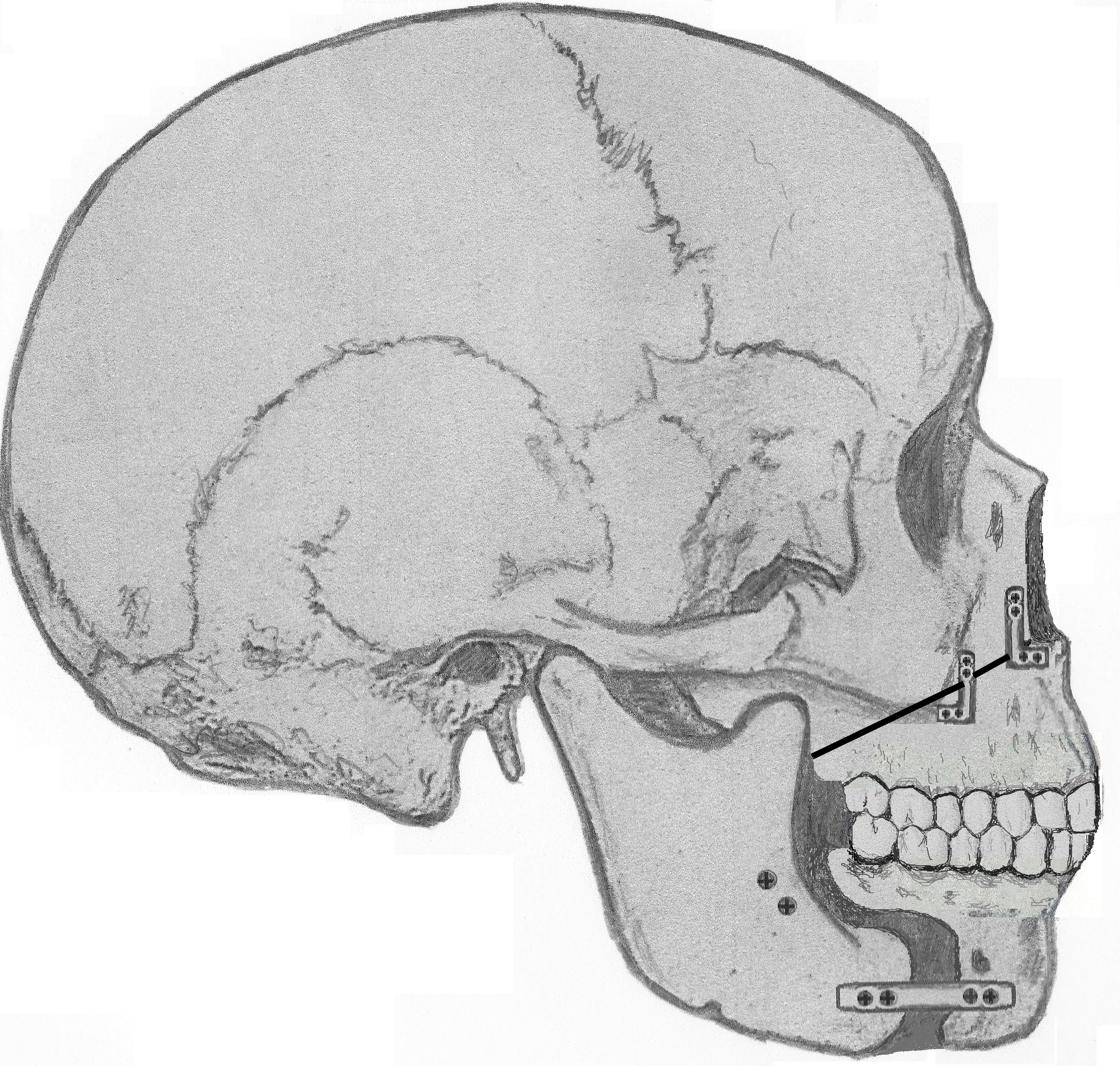
- Maxillomandibular advancement
- Specialty: Oral and maxillofacial surgery

Maxillomandibular advancement (MMA) or orthognathic surgery, also sometimes called bimaxillary advancement (Bi-Max), or maxillomandibular osteotomy (MMO), is a surgical procedure or sleep surgery which moves the upper jaw (maxilla) and the lower jaw (mandible) forward. The procedure was first used to correct deformities of the facial skeleton to include malocclusion. In the late 1970s advancement of the lower jaw (mandibular advancement) was noted to improve sleepiness in three patients. Subsequently, maxillomandibular advancement was used for patients with obstructive sleep apnea.

Currently, maxillomandibular advancement surgery is often performed simultaneously with genioglossus advancement (tongue advancement). The genioglossus advancement pulls the tongue forward in a manner that decreases the amount of tongue blockage during sleep. MMA has been demonstrated to be one of the most effective surgical treatments for sleep apnea, due to its high success rate. Nonetheless, the procedure is often used after other forms of treatment have failed (nasal surgeries, tonsillectomy, uvulopalatopharyngoplasty, tongue reduction surgeries). There is a longer recovery when compared to other sleep apnea surgeries, since the bones of the face have to heal into their new position.

== See also ==
- Le Fort I osteotomy
