= Coblation tonsillectomy =

Coblation Tonsillectomy
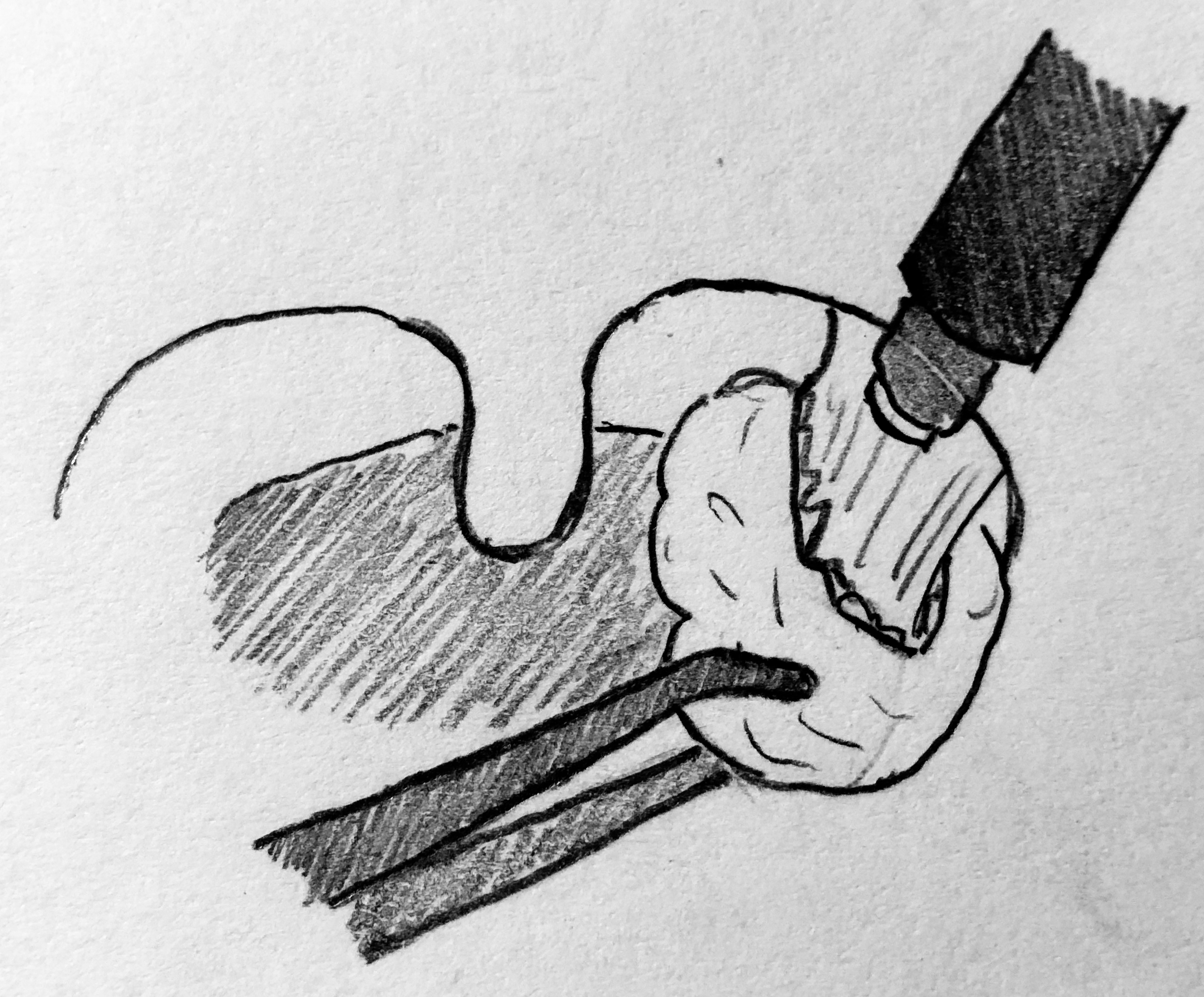
- Removal of a tonsil during the Coblation Tonsillectomy procedure.
- Other names: Controlled Ablation Tonsillectomy

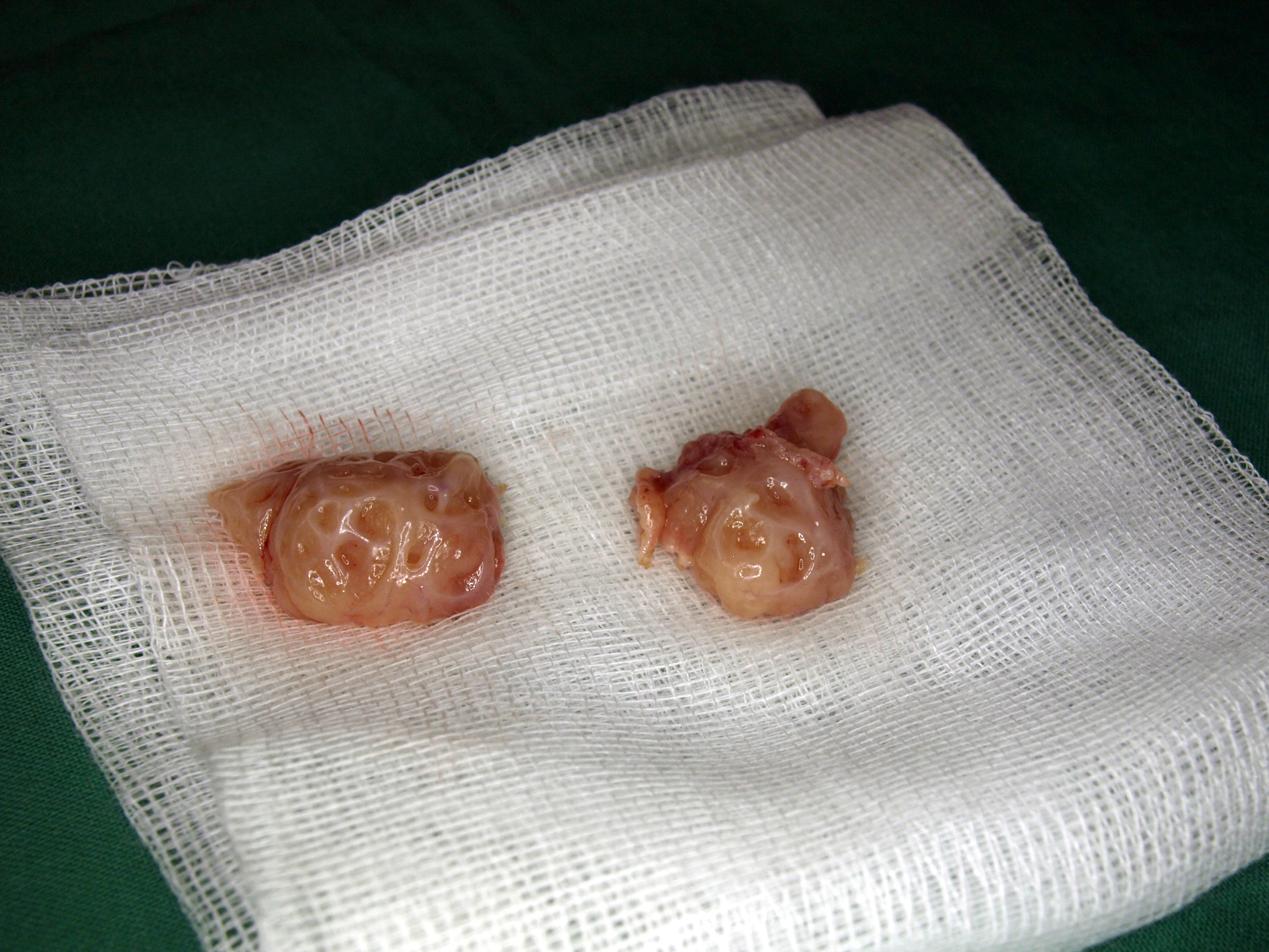
Removed human tonsils from a plasma coblation tonsillectomy

Coblation tonsillectomy or plasma coblation is a surgical procedure in which the patient's tonsils are removed by destroying the surrounding tissues that attach them to the pharynx. It was first implemented in 2001. The word coblation is short for 'controlled ablation', which means a controlled procedure used to destroy soft tissue.

This procedure uses low temperature radio frequency during the operation, which was found to cause less pain for the patient than previous technologies used for tonsillectomy. Data collected from coblation tonsillectomy operations showed that the healing of the tonsillar fossa is much faster when this low temperature technology is used instead of a heat based technology, such as electrocautery tonsillectomy.

Since coblation has been introduced to the medical field, more than 10 million surgical operations have been performed, but as of 2019, research is still ongoing to determine the positive and negative effects of this procedure. The process consists of five stages, which is significantly less than the traditional tonsillectomy method therefore allowing the technique of Plasma Coblation to the overall time required for the typical procedure, however there are also negatives associated with the device. which indicate that there is no clear advantage or difference in comparison to traditional surgical techniques today.

== Technology ==
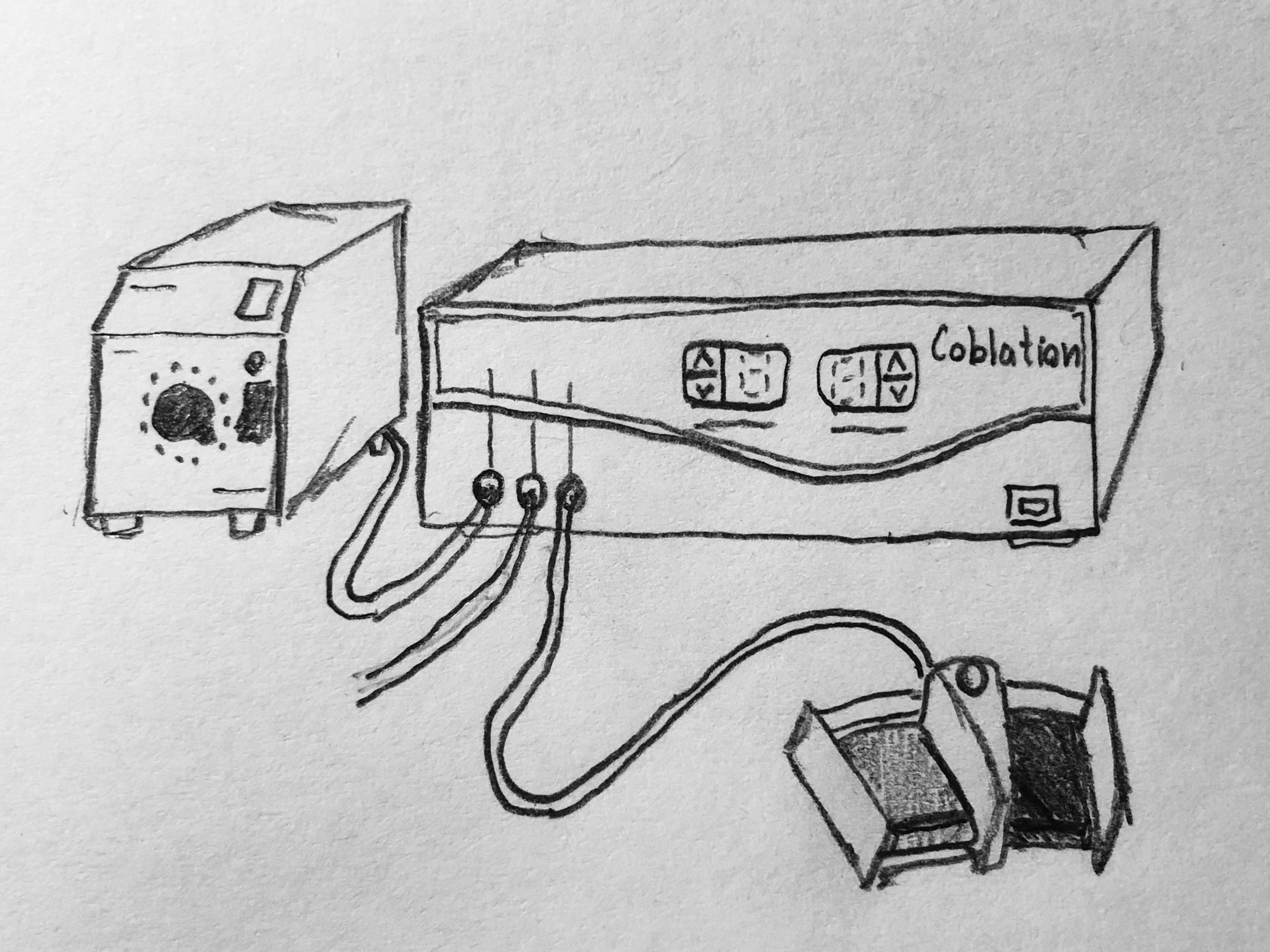
Radio frequency (RF) generator and the foot pedal controls.

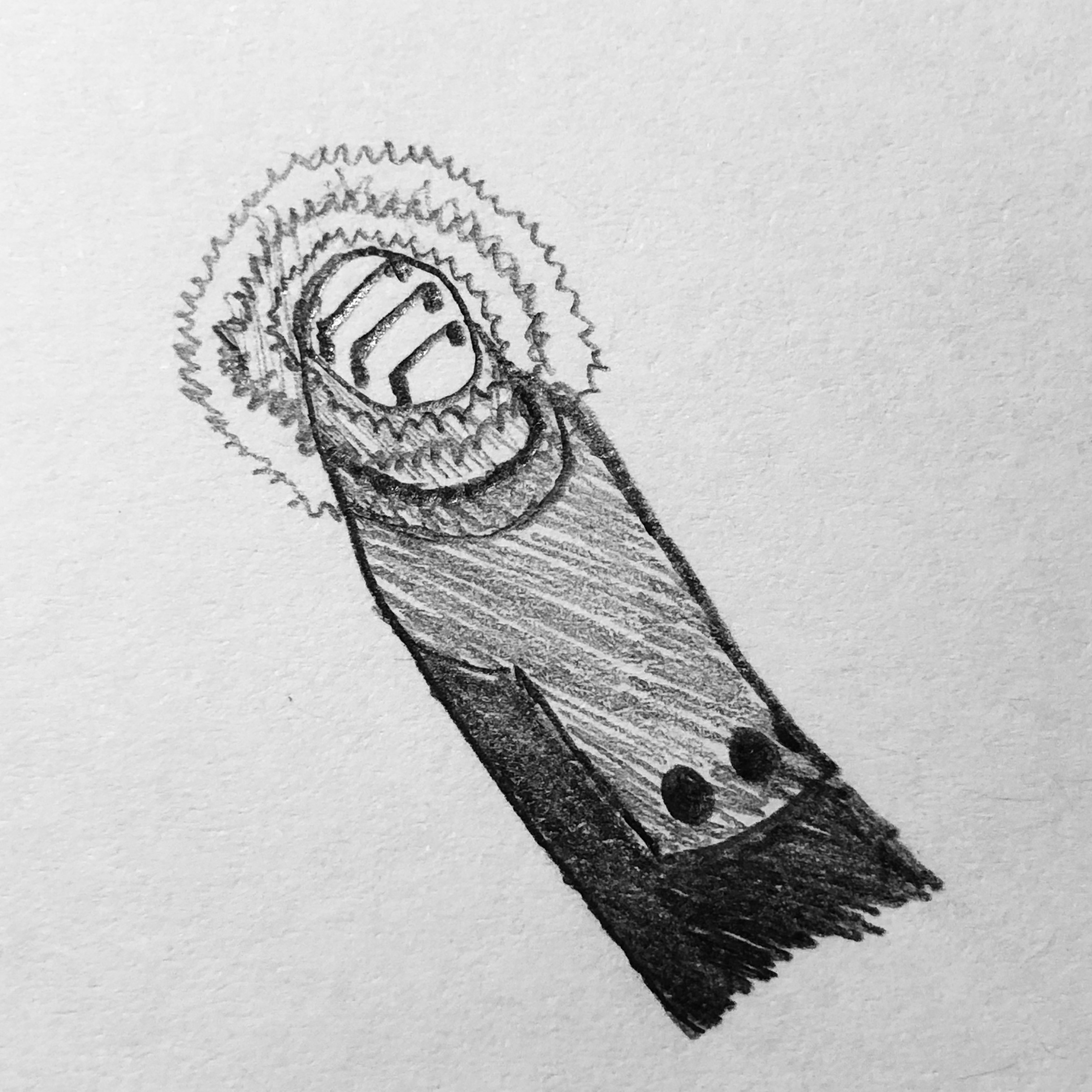
Plasma tonsil wand

Plasma coblation is widely used in the medical world as a successful surgical technique. The technique is used as a method of treating tonsillectomy and adenoidectomy which is the surgical removement of tonsils and soft tissue found towards the back of a nose which causes blockage.

=== Components ===
The equipment used for coblation tonsillectomy consists of a radio frequency (RF) generator, foot pedal control, irrigation system, and a tonsil wand. The generator provides radio frequency, which is essential for the procedure, and connects the foot pedal system to the tonsil wand. The foot pedals are colour coded to prevent confusion: one is yellow and is used for controlling the coblation, while the other is blue and used for controlling the radio frequency cautery. The wand is connected to the RF generator so it can be controlled with the pedals. The wand consists of a base electrode and an active electrode, which have ceramic and flowing saline between them. The radio frequency current that is produced by the generator travels through the saline, breaking the molecular bonds and forming ions. This creates a plasma field around the electrodes, which is used for removing soft tissue. There should not be any smoke produced while the coblation wand is being used during the operation; if this occurs, it is a sign that ablated tissue has entered the coblation wand's electrode area. This means that the current is not able to break down the saline into ions properly, so smoke is produced. When this happens, the coblation wand needs to be cleaned out before using it again.

=== Plasma field ===
The plasma field has a radius of about 100μm-200μm around the electrodes and is kept stable within the head of the coblation wand by the continuous supply of saline. Furthermore, the plasma field is controlled by the bipolar energy between the negative and positive ions that are produced by the plasma in order to use a precise amount of plasma to prevent damaging healthy tissues around the tonsils.

Plasma does not have a thermal effect on tissue: it only affects it on a chemical level. The plasma field produces positively charged hydrogen ions (H+) and negatively charged hydroxide ions (OH-), which enable plasma to destroy tissue. There is no or only minor damage done to nearby tissues during the coblation procedure because charged particles move between the generated plasma field and the ablated tissue, hence the molecules breakdown without the temperatures rising high.

The temperature for coblation tonsillectomy ranged from 60 °C to 70 °C, while other tonsillectomy operation procedures, such as electrosurgery require temperatures ranging from 400 °C to 600 °C, which is much higher. Thus, coblation is considered to be a non-heat focused medical procedure that is much better at causing minimal thermal damage to untargeted tissues near the targeted area.

== Reasons for surgery ==
The need for removing tonsils of an individual using the coblation tonsillectomy surgical process can occur for four reasons. Firstly, the patient may have frequent long lasting tonsillitis. Secondly, tonsils can become swollen and inflamed which may cause breathing problems. Thirdly, blood loss can occur through the tonsils, which is a sign that they need to be removed. Lastly, in some cases tonsils get affected by rare diseases and viruses, which can only be treated by removing the tonsils.

=== Tonsillitis ===
Tonsils are part of the first line of defense in the mouth as they create white blood cells in order to fight diseases, bacteria and viruses that enter through the mouth. Owing to being exposed to amounts of material that enter the mouth, tonsils can become infected, which is called tonsillitis. This occurs mainly in children as in this age group is when the tonsils are the key providers of immune system functions. By the time individuals reach adulthood, they have been exposed to many diseases, bacteria and viruses, so they have developed immunity against these infection causing micro-organisms. Thus, adults normally do not need the help of tonsils anymore.

When tonsillitis occurs regularly, meaning about seven times a year then the removal of tonsils is needed, otherwise it can have detrimental effects on the individual's health. Furthermore, tonsil surgery may be required when antibiotic treatment does not help in getting rid of the bacteria, which causes tonsillitis.

=== Swollen tonsils ===
After being exposed to several tonsil infections, tonsils have the tendency to become swollen and inflamed, but other factors may make them enlarged as well, such as genetics. Some of the significant problems that can arise due to having enlarged tonsils are breathing difficulties and the ability to swallow, thus the removal of tonsils is required.

=== Other conditions ===
After having frequent tonsil infections or severe diseases, bleeding from the tonsils tissues can occur. Furthermore, cancer cells can develop in the tonsil tissues. These are mostly uncommon but can still occur and can only be treated by surgically removing the tonsils from the both sides of the back of the throat.

== Risks of the surgery ==
Similarly to any other medical surgery, coblation tonsillectomy has health risk factors as well, which can but will not necessarily occur from the surgery. Firstly, reactions to the general anesthetic drug, which is used to make the patients sleep while they are under surgery, can cause both short-term and long-term health problems, for example minor health problems like vomiting, nausea, muscle soreness, headache, and major health problems can include death. Another risk factor is that swelling can occur throughout the whole mouth during the beginning section of the surgery, but swelling is most likely to occur on the tongue and in the tissues surrounding the tonsils at the back of the throat. Furthermore, rarely bleeding may be present in the tonsil area of the mouth throughout the surgical procedure, which would need extra treatment on top of the coblation tonsillectomy surgery. This would require the patient to remain in the hospital for a longer period of time in order to fully recover. Bleeding in areas around the tonsils can also occur during the healing stage in the first few weeks after surgery because the wound is still fresh and can open up in come occasions. In addition, infections may develop in the mouth from the surgery, the main cause of these infections are the surgical equipment that are used if they were not disinfected properly before surgical procedure.

Plasma coblation is still not the main used procedure due to its unknown disadvantages compared to current procedures and equipment, however its advantages and ability to decrease post operative pain and hospital stay has been ensured over the standard surgical procedures currently in use today.

== Surgery ==
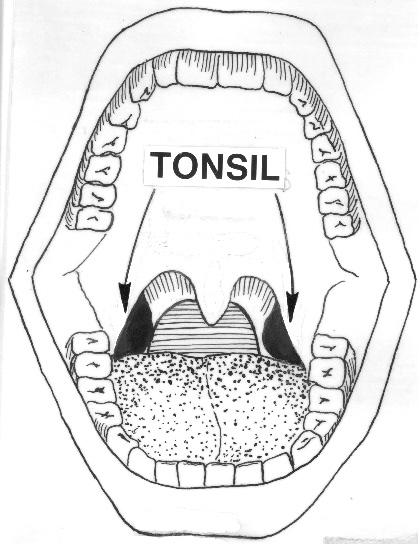
Location of tonsils in the mouth

=== Overview ===
The Coblation technology involves various key features which allow it to minimize heat damage caused to tissue during a surgical procedure. It is made up of three wires which contain electrodes for efficiently conducting the surgical procedure. More of its features include coordinated suction ports which allows for its ease of use, and a long pliable metal wand for easily targeting tissues to be removed. One of the main features include the saline solution which is used in-order to take advantage of the ionized particles to accurately target any infected and damaged tissue to be removed by the device.

When conducting surgical procedures with a plasma Coblation device, it consists of five stages. The procedure begins with the first stage by setting up the apparatus through the dissipation of heat throughout the device in-order to prevent direct heat emissions and decrease overall thermal effect of the device. The second step involves the removal of the infected or unwanted tissue of the device by targeting the area for the procedure. As the removal of the tissue occur the third step then involves of reducing the power of the electrode to avoid collateral damage to the tissue. Then finally the fourth and fifth step are conducted after the tissue has been removed, which then requires the dispersion of electron power and thermal energy within the device to avoid further damage to healthy tissue.

Tonsillectomy is a surgical procedure that consists of taking out the patient's tonsils, which produce chemical substances in back mouth area to assist in keeping a good health by fighting off infections. Tonsils can become enlarged when they are infected by a virus or bacteria over and over again, hence to combat the frequently occurring infections it becomes necessary to surgically remove the tonsils. High percentage of the population get their tonsils removed in their child years, however some people who do not go through the operation in their early years tend to get it removed later on in their lifetime because their tonsil glands swell to a point where they are struggling to breathe.

=== Before the procedure ===
Before the surgery begins, the surgeon will take multiple blood tests, physically examine the patient, and the surgeon will also check the past medical records of the patient to make sure it is safe to conduct the surgical procedure. On top of that, the surgeon doctor will ask about the types of medications that have been taken by the patient in the last 10 days following up to the surgery because certain medications can increase the chances of bleeding during the surgical procedure, such as aspirin and naproxen. Furthermore, the patient will be required to stop the consumption of any food and drinks for several hours before the procedure begins.

=== Surgical Procedure ===
Coblation tonsillectomy is an outpatient surgical process, meaning patients are able leave the hospital and go home after they have gone through the surgery and have woken up, so it is unnecessary for them to stay overnight.

At the start of the surgical procedure, the patient is given a specific amount of general anesthesia to go into a deep sleep, in which they are not able to feel any pain until it wears off, and by the time it wears off the operation is over as it tends take less than one hour for operation to be fully done. Additionally, a breathing tube is provided for the patient, which is inserted into the nose instead of the regular breathing tube for the mouth in order to have enough space in the mouth for the surgery to be conducted in a safe and precise manner.

The operation commences immediately after the patient has fallen asleep from the anesthesia. A mouth prop is used as a wedge to put between the upper and lower teeth on one side of the mouth in order to keep the patient's mouth wide open and steady for the surgeon to conduct the surgery with ease.

Both tonsils are removed with coblation technology by applying precise amounts of plasma to detach the tonsils from the surrounding tissues without causing thermal damage.

After the tonsils are fully removed, any bleeding that occurs at the back of the throat is stopped and the patient is woken up using medical drugs. Then the breathing tubes are completely removed and the patient is moved to the post-anesthesia care unit to recover and wake up.

== Recovery from surgery ==
After the coblation tonsillectomy surgery, the patient will be taken the recovery room, where they will wake up soon after the surgery. A nurse will check the patient's blood pressure, heart rate, and if any bleeding is present. If bleeding is present in the tonsil area due to slow recovery rate then the patient will be required to stay at the hospital overnight. Otherwise, if everything is stable then the patient can go home, but a relative or someone close to the patient will be required to take them home and take care of the patient until necessary.

One to two weeks is normally the required time to for all wounds to fully heal from the coblation tonsillectomy surgery. If the patient is still recovering at home, they should try not to come in contact with any sick people because the recovery stage is critical as they can easily get an infection in the tonsil area. The patient will likely experience pain in the throat, ears, jaws, and neck where it is most common. So it is recommended to take pain medication to reduce the pain in these areas. Furthermore, to assist the recovery of the wounds and to avoid any obstacles during recovery, the patient should consume lots of fluids to prevent being dehydrated. The patient only consume food that can be swallowed with an ease, soft and smooth food is recommended in order to prevent reopening the wounds from the surgery. The most vital part of recovery is taking lots of bed rest and avoiding physical activity, like sports for about two weeks.

In some cases, it is vital for the patient to see a doctor immediately or go to emergency in a hospital if any health problems occur during recovery, for example bleeding, fever, dehydration and breathing problems.

== Assessment ==
Plasma coblation is used mainly for procedures performed in the ENT surgical areas, which has allowed for the overall improvement of surgical procedures such as tonsillectomy allowing multiple benefits to both its patients and surgeons. However, there are also some negative affects associated with the surgical device which have resulted in less wider use of the procedure around the world when compared to the safer traditional method. Overall there has been no clear difference or advantage over other surgical techniques/procedures that are performed in today's surgeries.

=== Advantages ===
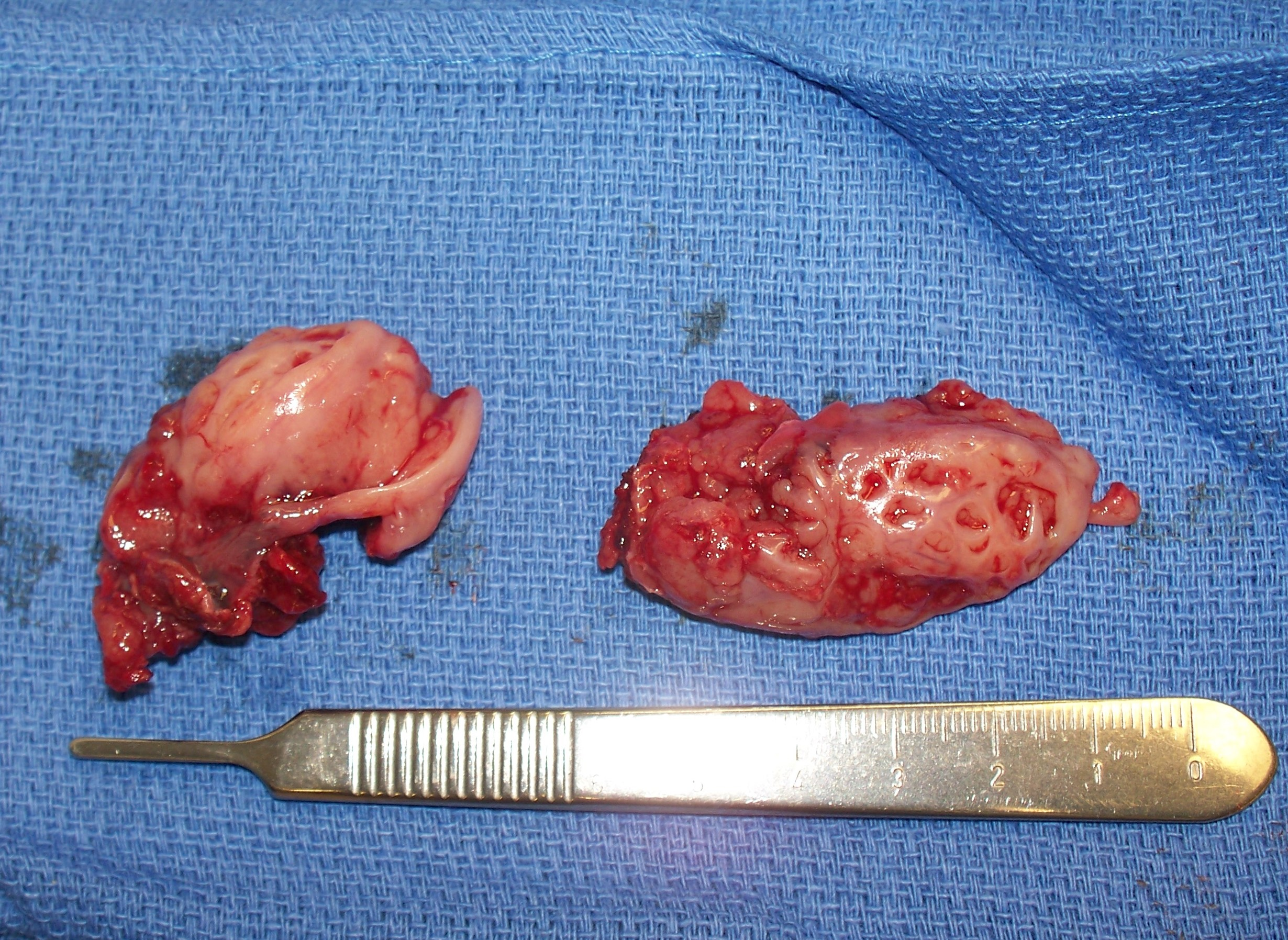
Traditional tonsillectomy surgery removal of tonsils

There are multiple advantages of plasma coblation compared to the standard tonsillectomy procedure which include:

- Requires less surgical time for the procedure to be completed.
- Largely minimise thermal damage which occur to surrounding tissue during the procedure compared to the traditional method.
- Faster recovery of the procedure as it is classified as a minimally-invasive surgical method as it utilise radio frequency compared to incisions in the body.
- Less operative pain as no incision is required to perform the procedure.

=== Disadvantages ===
Although there are various advantages associated with plasma coblation, the procedure also contains disadvantages which allow the traditional surgery for tonsillectomy to be preferred. Some of which are:

- Small field of view when removing tissue.
- Little depth perception.
- Poor mobility of removing tissue within the surgical site.
- Requires higher standards of safety procedures to be followed. If not followed carefully and specifically, excess burning to healthy tissue could occur.

== History ==
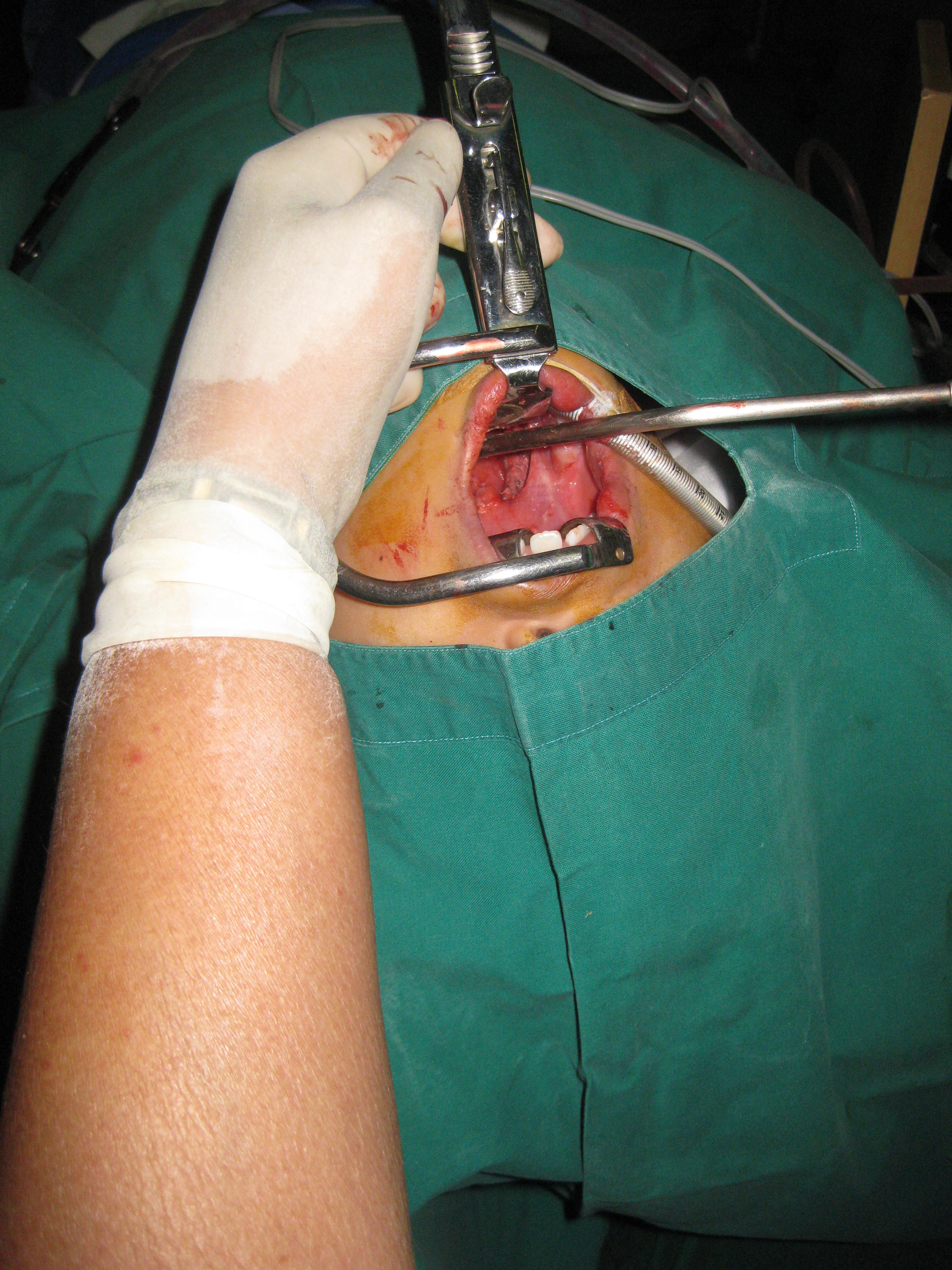
Traditional tonsillectomy surgery which requires invasive equipment.

Electric surgical equipment was developed in the 1950. They provided a revolutionized way of using high frequency wavelengths in order to disintegrate unwanted cell matter. First it began with the use of radio frequency passing through the devices medium. Its development throughout the years began which was the experimentation with higher and more efficient plasma frequency made up of charged ions to target unwanted matter in the arteries.

The discovery of the coblation procedure was by both Philip Eggers and Hira Thapliyal. This discovery was made in order to develop the surgical techniques for treatment of artery blockages. Over time experiments were conducted to determine the success of the device in comparison to the standard method for surgical tonsillectomy. After undergoing many trails and experiments, the success of the device was determined which allowed them to be used as a typical surgical technique. This resulted in Coblation procedures to become developed in the mid-1990s and it become more widely spread when health companies adopted the techniques in order to minimise their costs in the long run, and use a faster surgical technique.
