= American Sleep Apnea Association =

American non-profit organization

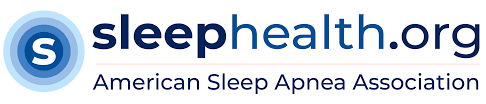
- Abbreviation: ASAA
- Formation: 1990
- Type: non-profit organization
- Website: Official website

The American Sleep Apnea Association (ASAA) is a non-profit organization founded in 1990 by persons with sleep apnea, health care providers and researchers. The association offers education and advocacy services to improve the lives of sleep apnea patients.

In March 2016, the organization partnered with IBM Watson to launch a ResearchKit study app called SleepHealth, to study the connection between sleep habits and health outcomes.
