= Uvulopalatopharyngoplasty =

Sleep surgery on the throat

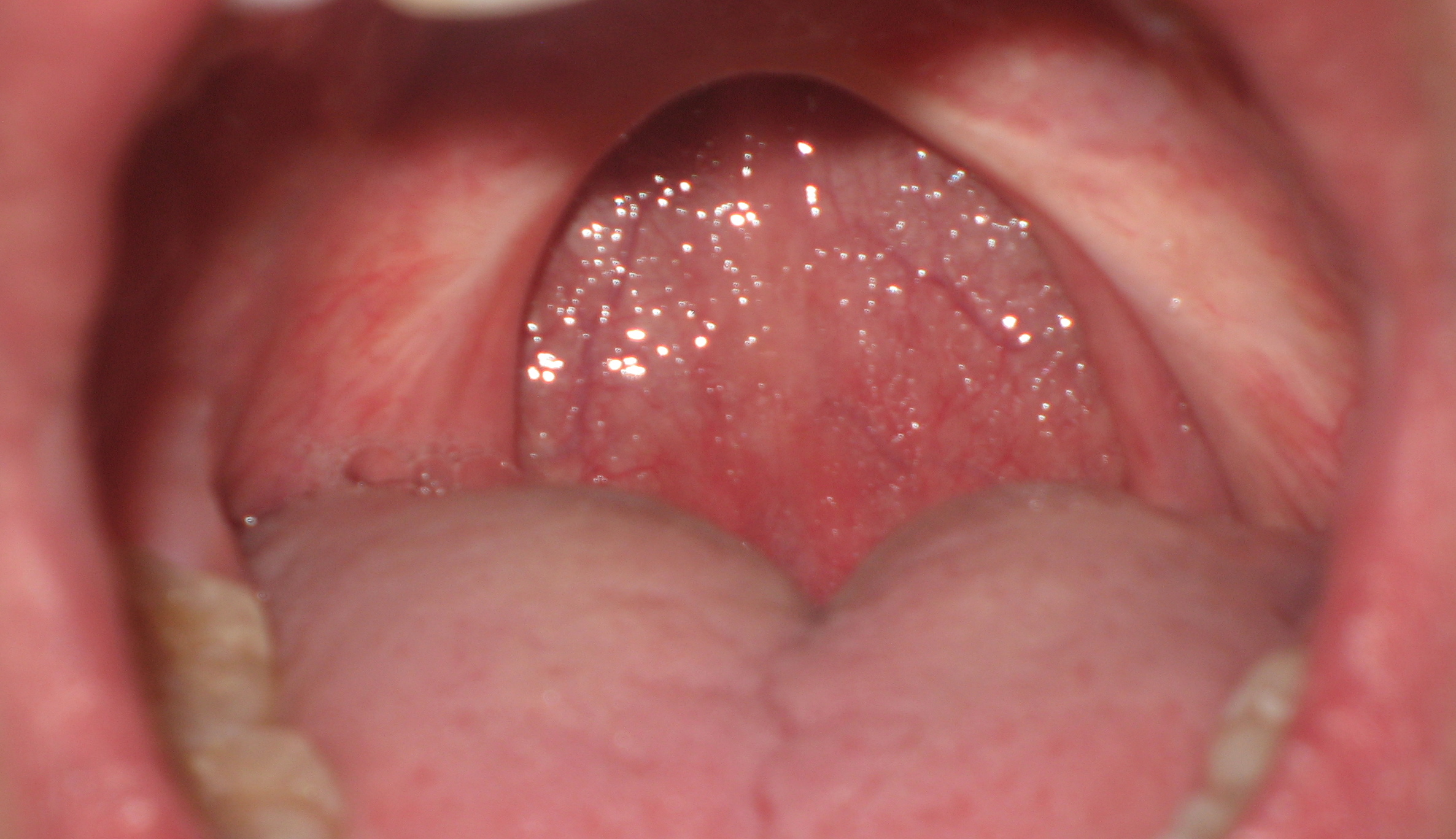
- View of the throat 8 years following uvulopalatopharyngoplasty
- ICD-9-CM: 27.6, 27.7, 29

Uvulopalatopharyngoplasty (abbreviated as UPPP or UP3) is a type of sleep surgery, which are surgical procedures for sleep-related breathing disorders, especially obstructive sleep apnea (OSA). Uvulopalatopharyngoplasty involves removal and/or remodeling of tissues in the throat in order to prevent obstruction of the airway during sleep. Tissues which may typically be removed include the paryngeal tonsils and the adenoid tonsil. Tissues which may typically be remodeled include the uvula (see uvulotomy), the soft palate, and parts of the pharynx. UPPP is the most common surgical procedure performed for OSA.

== Background ==
OSA is one of the most common types of sleep-related breathing disorder. It involves obstruction of the upper airway during sleep. Loud snoring and apnea (periods of no breathing) followed by gasping and choking are signs of the condition. The main treatment is continuous positive airway pressure and a range of other measures such sleeping on the side and mandibular advancement splints.

== Definition ==
Exactly what procedures fall under the category UPPP is poorly defined. Some consider all of the following to be UPPP:

- Tonsillectomy
- UPPP with tonsillectomy / adenoidectomy
- Laser assisted uvulopalatoplasty (LAUP)
- Palatal stiffening (pillar procedure)
- Cautery assisted palatal stiffening operation (CAPSO)
- Relocation pharyngoplasty
- Lateral pharyngoplasty
- Expansion sphincter pharyngoplasty
- Barbed reposition pharyngoplasty
- Palatal advancement pharyngoplasty

== Indications ==
UPPP may be indicated if all of the following are true:

- Diagnosis of obstructive sleep apnea
- Failure of non invasive treatments (e.g., continuous positive airway pressure, mandibular advancement splint)
- Site of airway obstruction identified (soft palate) and amenable to correction with UPPP

Sleep surgery generally aims to correct one or more of the following three types of airway obstruction in OSA:

- Too little space (craniofacial anomaly)
- Too much tissue (tissue hypertrophy or obesity)
- Tissue too lax (nerve damage, poor muscle tone)

Of the above, UPPP is indicated in cases where there is too much tissue. It removes excess soft tissue from the back of the soft palate, thereby increasing the amount of space in the airway. UPPP also reduces the collapsibility of the upper airway.

=== Patient selection ===
It is difficult to predict which individuals will benefit from UPPP and which will not. The important factors may be the position of the palate with respect to the tongue, the size of the tonsils, and the individual's body mass index. The Friedman tongue position / palate position is one method to assess the level of obstruction in the pharynx. Removal of the tonsils seems to be a major contributor of success and removal of larger tonsils resulting in improved outcomes.

== Contraindications ==
Contraindications for UPPP include:

- Morbid obesity / Body mass index more than 40kg/m^{2}.
- Retrognathia (small lower jaw).
- Retroglossia (tongue positioned further back than normal).
- Narrowing of the hypopharynx (laryngopharynx). Success rate is only 5% when hypopharyneal narrowing is present. If combined with maxillomandibular advancement, UPPP may still be possible.
- Pharyngeal wall bulging.
- Sagittal (front-to-back) orientation of airway.

== Technique ==
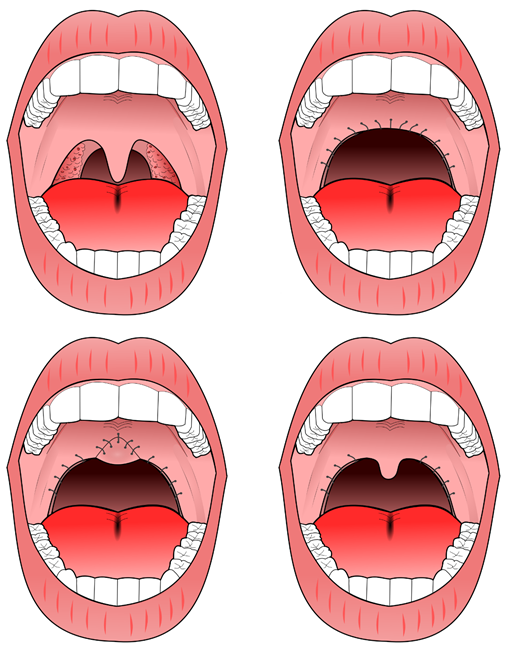
Uvulopalatopharyngoplasty. A) pre-operative, B) original UPPP, C) modified UPPP, and D) minimal UPPP.

First, the surgeon cuts into the soft palate starting from a point above the palatal tonsil towards the uvula. Then, the mucosa of the soft palate, tonsillar fossa, and side of the uvula is separated from the underlying tissue layers and removed, leaving any excess nasal mucosa. The edges of the remaining mucosa are sutured back together and the tonsillar pillars may be sutured closed. If the uvula is long, it is shortened or removed completely. Often, the palatal tonsils are removed at the same time, if they have not already been removed. The result of UPPP is that the soft palate is shortened by removing a wedge of excess mucosa from the palate. UPPP decreases the amount of anterior-posterior (front to back) palatal collapse and widens the pharyngeal airway.

UPPP may be combined with other types of sleep surgery to address airway obstruction at different sites. This is termed the multilevel surgery. The effectiveness of UPPP is increased when it is combined with another procedure as a multilevel surgery. Examples include UPPP with tonsillectomy or UPPP with a hypopharyngeal procedure such as tongue base reduction or hyoid suspension or UPPP with radiofrequency ablation.

== Modifications of uvulopalatopharyngoplasty ==
Different modifications of the original UPPP technique have been developed, termed modified uvulopalatopharyngoplasty (modUPPP or mUPPP). To distinguish them, the original procedure is sometimes termed standard, conventional, or traditional UPPP. These modifications were deeveloped because the original UPPP for OSA was quite invasive and involved removal of a relatively large amount of soft tissue. This sometimes results in significant complications. Modifications of UPPP and the year they were introduced are listed below:

- Powell’s uvulopalatal flap (introduced in 1996).
- Extended uvulopalatal flap (EUPF; 2003).
- Lateral pharyngoplasty (LP; 2003).
- Z-palatoplasty (ZPP; 2004).
- Han-UPPP (2005).
- Expansion sphincter pharyngoplasty (ESP; 2007).
- Microdebrider-assisted extended uvulopalatoplasty (MEUP; 2008).
- Relocation pharyngoplasty (rPP; 2009).
- Z-palatopharyngoplasty (Z-PPP; 2010).
- Soft palate webbing flap (SPWF; 2015).

=== Uvuloplalatal flap with uvular preservation ===
This variant of UPPP reduces the risk of velopharyngeal incompetence and has less pain.

=== Anterior advancement palatoplasty ===
This variant of UPPP preserves the back edge of the soft palate while moving the soft palate forwards.

=== Expansion sphincter pharyngoplasty ===
The palatopharyngeal muscle is repositioned anteriorly (in a more forwards position).

== Recovery ==
UPPP may be carried out as outpatient surgery (day case surgery), but it is sometimes done as an inpatient procedure.

== Complications ==
Possible short-term complications include:

- Intubation not possible.
- Negative-pressure pulmonary edema (post-obstructive pulmonary edema).
- Bleeding (1-2% risk, which may occur at any time in the first 2 weeks after the procedure).
- Dehydration.
- Persistent pain (more than 2 weeks after the procedure).

Upper airway edema may be too much when UPPP is done at the same time as maxillomandibular advancement. Possible long-term complications:

- Dysphagia (possibly related to undiagnosed gastroesophageal reflux disease).
- Dysgeusia (change in sense of taste).
- Globus pharyngis (a sensation of something being stuck in the throat; in up to 31% of cases).
- Velopharyngeal insufficiency (rare).
- Nasopharyngeal stenosis.
- Xerostomia (dry mouth) and dry throat, which may be related to loss of the uvula.

The overall rate of complications is about 35%. Some of the complications are significant, such as velopharyngeal insufficiency and globus pharyngeus.

== Effectiveness ==
=== Obstructive sleep apnea ===
Systematic reviews have reported successful outcome after UPPP for OSA in the range of 35-95%. The AHI reduces by an average of 18.6 events per hour. The Epworth sleepiness scale changes by an average of 5.4. The effect of UPPP often reduces over time.

UPPP may also reduce the risk of conditions linked to OSA, such as congestive heart failure and atrial fibrillation. UPPP may also reduce depression.

In recent years, UPPP has become less popular among surgeons. This is related to the rate of complications and its overall low cure rate in unselected patients with OSA (40%). The 40% success rate was from a landmark study in 1996 which defined successful outcome after surgery as AHI score less than 20 and over 50% reduction in AHI compared to before surgery. UPPP by itself has limited effectiveness for OSA. Now UPPP is often combined with other procedures as a multilevel surgery, giving improved outcomes. For example, uvula preserving UPPP with maxillomandibular advancement was found to be a more effective combination when compared to several other types of maxillomandibular advancement.

Since many people have collapse of the lateral walls of the pharynx, another procedure called expansion sphincter palatoplasty has become more popular. Hypoglossal nerve stimulation may have superior results to UPPP.

== History ==
UPPP was originally devised in 1964 by Ikematsu as a treatment for snoring. It was not until the years after 1965 that OSA began to be recognized as a distinct condition. UPPP was first used for OSA in 1981 in the USA by Shiro Fujita and colleagues. This was the same year that CPAP was introduced. The UPPP for OSA was more invasive than the original UPPP for snoring. After its introduction, UPPP quickly became the most popular surgical treatment for OSA. Several modifications of the UPPP technique were introduced from about 1996 to 2015.
