= ZC4H2 =

Protein-coding gene in the species Homo sapiens

Identifiers
- Aliases: ZC4H2, HCA127, KIAA1166, WRWF, WWS, zinc finger C4H2-type containing, MRXS4, MCS, WRWFFR
- External IDs: OMIM: 300897; MGI: 2679294; GeneCards: ZC4H2

Gene location (Human)
Chr.	X chromosome (human)
Band	Xq11.2	Start	64,915,802 bp
Band	Xq11.2	End	65,034,713 bp

Gene location (Mouse)
Chr.	X chromosome (mouse)
Band	X|X C3	Start	94,682,799 bp
Band	X|X C3	End	94,702,115 bp
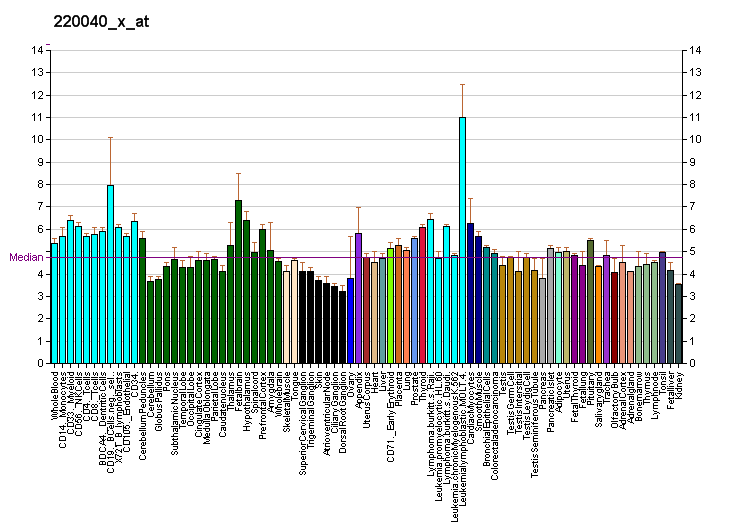
RNA expression pattern
Bgee	Human / Mouse (ortholog); Top expressed in: ganglionic eminence; ventricular zone; prefrontal cortex; muscle layer of sigmoid colon; popliteal artery; tibial arteries; stromal cell of endometrium; C1 segment; Descending thoracic aorta; islet of Langerhans / Top expressed in: superior cervical ganglion; medial ganglionic eminence; hand; genital tubercle; trigeminal ganglion; tail of embryo; otolith organ; ventricular zone; utricle; primitive streak; More reference expression data
BioGPS	More reference expression data
Gene ontology
Molecular function	protein binding; metal ion binding
Cellular component	cytoplasm; cell junction; postsynaptic membrane; plasma membrane; synapse; nucleus; membrane
Biological process	multicellular organism development; spinal cord motor neuron differentiation; neuromuscular junction development; nervous system development; positive regulation of neuron differentiation; cell differentiation
Sources:Amigo / QuickGO
Orthologs
Databases	NCBI: entry; OMA: entry
Species	Human	Mouse
Entrez	55906	245522
Ensembl	ENSG00000126970	ENSMUSG00000035062
UniProt	Q9NQZ6	Q68FG0
RefSeq (mRNA)	NM_001178032; NM_001178033; NM_001243804; NM_018684	NM_001003916; NM_001289696; NM_001289697
RefSeq (protein)	NP_001171503; NP_001171504; NP_001230733; NP_061154	NP_001003916; NP_001276625; NP_001276626
Location (UCSC)	Chr X: 64.92 – 65.03 Mb	Chr X: 94.68 – 94.7 Mb
PubMed search
- Wikidata
View/Edit Human	View/Edit Mouse

Zinc finger C4H2 domain-containing protein is a protein which in humans is encoded by the gene ZC4H2 gene. The ZC4H2 protein is involved in nervous system development, and in particular the development of major noradrenaline-producing neuron regions such as the locus coeruleus. The ubiquitin ligase, RNF220, and ZC4H2 form a complex which monoubiquitinates the proteins PHOX2A and PHOX2B, which increases their DNA-binding ability.

== See also ==
- Wieacker syndrome
- ZC4H2-associated rare disorders
