= ROHHAD =

- Other names: ROHHADNET
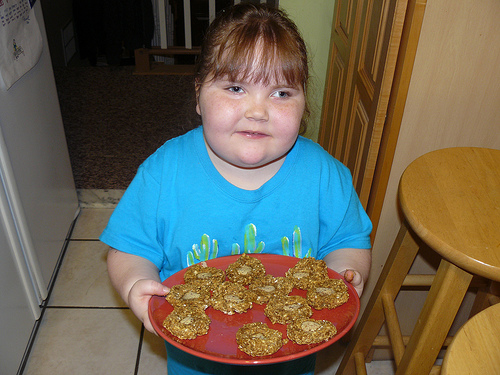
- A photograph of a child who has been diagnosed with ROHHAD
- Symptoms: rapid onset obesity, hypothalamic dysfunction, hypoventilation, autonomic dysfunction, neuroendocrine tumors, behavior problems
- Usual onset: 1.5-11 years of age
- Causes: unknown
- Frequency: 158 cases reported worldwide

Rapid-onset obesity with hypothalamic dysregulation, hypoventilation, and autonomic dysregulation (ROHHAD) is a rare condition whose etiology is currently unknown. ROHHAD mainly affects the endocrine system and autonomic nervous system, but patients can exhibit a variety of signs. Patients present with both alveolar hypoventilation along with hypothalamic dysfunction, which distinguishes ROHHAD from congenital central hypoventilation syndrome (CCHS). ROHHAD is a rare disease, with only 100 reported cases worldwide thus far.

The first sign of ROHHAD is a rapid weight gain between 1.5 and 11 years of age. Typically, hypoventilation, or abnormally slow breathing, presents after the rapid onset obesity. Symptoms of hypothalamic dysfunction and autonomic dysfunction present in a variety of ways, but in order for a diagnosis of ROHHAD to be made, they must be present in some form. Approximately 40% of patients will develop neuroendocrine tumors. There is also a possibility of behavioral disorders, but some children with ROHHAD have normal cognitive development and intelligence.

Treatment plans for ROHHAD vary depending on each patient's symptoms. There is no cure, so treatment is geared toward managing the symptoms that each patient manifests. ROHHAD is fatal in 50-60% of cases when undiagnosed and untreated, due to cardiopulmonary arrest secondary to untreated hypoventilation. The earlier the disease is diagnosed and treatment starts, the better a child's prognosis is.

== Signs and symptoms ==
=== Rapid-onset Obesity ===
The rapid onset obesity aspect of ROHHAD is usually the first diagnostic indicator of the disease. Patients often present with hyperphagia and rapid weight gain. This rapid weight gain is defined as 20-30 pounds over a 6-12 month period, and typically occurs between the ages of 1.5 and 11.

=== Hypothalamic dysfunction ===
Hypothalamic dysfunction refers to the hypothalamus, which is a structure within the brain which participates in regulating the pituitary gland, autonomic nervous system, and endocrine system. Symptoms related to hypothalamic dysfunction may include abnormal sodium balance (hyponatremia or hypernatremia), high progestin levels, low cortisol levels, delayed or early-onset puberty, and low thyroid hormone. Patients will also often experience a decelerated growth rate throughout childhood.

Sodium imbalance within the body can have severe symptoms and be potentially life-threatening if not controlled. Hyponatremia, or low sodium levels, can cause symptoms such as nausea, headache, seizures, or even cause patients to become comatose. Hypernatremia, or high sodium levels in the blood, can cause nausea, muscle weakness, altered mental status, or coma. Irregular temperature regulation and diabetes insipidus are also possible symptoms of hypothalamic dysfunction.

ROHHAD patients develop these symptoms at varying ages and in varying numbers, but all patients will develop some symptoms of hypothalamic dysfunction.

=== Hypoventilation ===
Symptoms of hypoventilation and breathing malfunctions typically present after the rapid weight gain. Some patients may initially develop obstructive sleep apnea, which is common in obese children. Obstructive sleep apnea is the most common form of sleep apnea, and causes breathing to abruptly stop and begin again during sleep. This is caused by throat muscles relaxing during sleep and blocking the airway, and is typically noticed as patients will snore loudly throughout the night. Every patient diagnosed with ROHHAD develops alveolar hypoventilation, regardless of whether they presented with sleep apnea. Alveolar hypoventilation is a condition in which patients have very low blood oxygen levels and shallow breathing. In healthy patients, when blood oxygen levels are low, the brain sends a signal to breathe and bring more oxygen to the blood. In ROHHAD patients, this reaction does not occur. This condition is usually only present during sleep. However, in more severely affected patients, shallow breathing may continue throughout the day. Hypoventilation can go unnoticed until cardiopulmonary arrest, which is why ROHHAD has the potential to be a fatal disease. Ventilatory support is required for patients during sleep, but it is only needed during waking hours for those most severely affected (about 50% of patients).

=== Autonomic Dysfunction ===
Autonomic dysfunction refers to the autonomic nervous system, which is responsible for regulating internal processes without conscious intervention. This may involve abnormalities in cardiac rhythm, temperature regulation, digestion, and eye movements. Not all ROHHAD patients will experience all of these symptoms, however they will have at least some of these issues. Examples of autonomic dysfunction include hyperthermia, hypothermia, pupillary dysfunction, strabismus, and chronic constipation/diarrhea.

=== Neuroendocrine tumors ===
Approximately 40% of ROHHAD patients will develop tumors originating in the neural crest. These tumors are typically classified as ganglioneuromas or ganglioneuroblastomas. These tumors are not believed to significantly worsen or contribute to the prognosis of ROHHAD. It was suggested that ROHHAD be renamed ROHHADNET in order to include these tumors in the diagnostic criteria, but this has only been adopted for patients who develop these tumors.

=== Behavioral issues ===
Some children diagnosed with ROHHAD may also present with behavioral disorders and/or intellectual disability. However, this is believed to be a result of low oxygen levels secondary to hypoventilation during childhood development. The later ROHHAD is diagnosed, the greater the risk for behavioral problems due to hypoxia from hypoventilation or during cardiopulmonary arrest.

== Cause ==
The etiology of ROHHAD is currently unknown, and the condition is diagnosed based on a set of clinical criteria. It is believed that there may be a genetic component to ROHHAD, however there is no widely accepted gene linked to the disease. There has been one ROHHAD patient identified to have a mutation in the retinoic acid-induced 1(RAI1) gene through Whole Exome Sequencing, but there has been no otherwise proven link between the RAI1 gene and ROHHAD.

It is believed that ROHHAD originates from a combination of genetic and environmental or immunological factors. As of yet, evidence of its etiology has not been discovered and is not well understood.

In 2011, a case of monozygotic twins with divergent ROHHAD phenotypes was reported. One twin was affected with ROHHAD and developed symptoms, while the other twin developed normally. This report questioned the theory that ROHHAD is genetically inherited, and the authors suggest that the disease may have an autoimmune or epigenetic etiology.

== Pathophysiology ==
The pathophysiology of ROHHAD is not currently known or understood.

== Diagnosis ==
Rapid obesity is the first symptom to arise between the ages of 1.5 and 11. This is typically followed by hypoventilation, which if left untreated, can result in fatal cardiorespiratory arrest. This is why early diagnosis has proven to be imperative for ROHHAD patients, and it has been suggested that ROHHAD be considered in every isolated case of early rapid-onset obesity. Early diagnosis is also vital in preventing and correcting electrolyte and hormone imbalances caused by hypothalamic dysfunction, in order to promote healthy development and prevent further problems.

As the symptoms of ROHHAD are so diverse and the condition is so rare, the disease is often misdiagnosed as Cushing's disease or Congenital Central Hypoventilation Syndrome when it first presents in patients.

== Prevention ==
As the cause of ROHHAD is unknown, there is no way to prevent onset of the disease.

== Management ==
There is no known cure for ROHHAD, therefore treatment for the disease involves managing symptoms as they manifest in the patient. As not all ROHHAD patients develop the same symptoms, treatment plans vary between patients. Proper treatment of hypothalamic dysfunction and hypoventilation is the most critical aspect of ROHHAD management, as these symptoms have the greatest ability to cause death or behavioral problems if left uncontrolled.

=== Rapid onset obesity treatment ===
Attempting to control weight through diet and exercise can be exceedingly difficult in patients with ROHHAD due to a number of factors. Encouraging ROHHAD patients to exercise vigorously can be dangerous, as their breathing will not increase with exertion and this can cause hypoxia. Therefore, it is important for ROHHAD patients to exercise at a moderate intensity and for their oxygen levels to be monitored throughout. Typically, the obesity associated with ROHHAD is managed by preventing further weight gain as the child grows.

=== Hypothalamic dysfunction treatment ===
Treatment for hypothalamic dysfunction is tailored to each patient's needs, as there is no set of hypothalamic symptoms that all ROHHAD patients will manifest. All ROHHAD patients should be evaluated by a pediatric endocrinologist in order to determine a treatment plan for hypothalamic dysfunction.

Patients may be given human growth hormone to treat stunted growth, or hormone replacement to treat any hormone deficiencies. Often patients are placed on a strict fluid regimen to treat for imbalances such as hyponatremia or hypernatremia. Patients who present with diabetes insipidus may also be treated with desmopressin, a synthetic replacement for anti-diuretic hormone.

=== Hypoventilation treatment ===
Every ROHHAD patient requires some form of ventilatory support, ranging from non-invasive BiPAP machines to tracheostomy procedures. Approximately 50% of ROHHAD patients will require ventilatory support day and night, whereas the other half only require night-time support.

A bilevel positive airway pressure machine, or BiPAP, is a ventilator mask worn at night. The BiPAP pushes air into the lungs, therefore breathing for the patient. This is helpful for ROHHAD patients, as hypoventilation causes the mechanism that controls breathing in oxygen to slow and sometimes stop during sleep.

A tracheostomy is a surgical procedure to create a hole in the trachea in order to give access to the airways for insertion of ventilatory tubing. This procedure is performed to create an airway in situations when long term continuous use of a ventilator is needed. ROHHAD patients whose hypoventilation is so severe that they require support during both day and night will often undergo tracheostomies.

=== Autonomic dysfunction treatment ===
Treatment for autonomic dysfunction varies greatly, depending on the severity and type of dysfunction. Many patients with ROHHAD experience strabismus, which is a weakness in the eye muscles causing a "cross-eyed" effect. This can be treated with glasses, eye muscle exercises, or even surgery. ROHHAD patients also often experience bradycardia, or low heart rate. This may require the placement of a cardiac pacemaker in order to regulate the heartbeat. Gastrointestinal problems, such as constipation or diarrhea, are often treated on an as-needed basis with laxatives or dietary changes. It is also important that ambient temperatures are monitored in patients who have temperature regulation issues such as hyperthermia or hypothermia.

=== Neuroendocrine tumor treatment ===
Tumors of neural crest origin develop in approximately 40% of patients. These are typically ganglioneuromas or ganglioneuroblastomas. Neural crest tumors have the ability to form in multiple organs tissues throughout the body, typically in the chest or abdomen. It is therefore important for ROHHAD patients to have regular MRI and CT scans to screen for tumor growth. It is believed that these tumors do not significantly affect the prognosis for ROHHAD patients. Neuroendocrine tumors can arise 7–16 years after the initial onset of symptoms, therefore the name ROHHADNET (which includes these tumors) has not been widely accepted as it is believed this name would lead to further misdiagnosis. Treatment for these neuroendocrine tumors requires surgical removal, typically performed by a pediatric oncologist.

== Prognosis ==
The most dangerous and fatal aspect of ROHHAD is the potential for cardiopulmonary arrest if hypoventilation is not found and treated in a timely manner. Approximately 50 to 60% of ROHHAD patients die due to cardiopulmonary arrest. The earlier symptoms are identified and patients are diagnosed, the more positive their outcomes are.

It has been found that children who are diagnosed earlier in life and, by extension, receive earlier treatment for hypoventilation and hypothalamic dysfunction (fluid imbalances, etc.) are less likely to develop behavioral issues or experience sudden cardiorespiratory arrest later in life.

== Research ==
A group at Ann & Robert H. Lurie Children's Hospital of Chicago has an international repository for patients with ROHHAD, which is available to researchers who are interested in the disease.

As of June 2018, there are 3 clinical trials currently recruiting patients with ROHHAD being performed respectively at Lurie Children's Hospital, Sidney Kimmel Cancer Center, and Boston Children's Hospital.

== Epidemiology ==
There have been at least 158 documented cases of ROHHAD worldwide.

== History ==
ROHHAD was first described in 1965, and this was believed to be the first reported instance of hypoventilation presenting alongside hypothalamic dysfunction.

ROHHAD had often been mistaken for congenital central hypoventilation syndrome, until the distinction was made by Ize-Ludlow et al. in 2007. These conditions are now permanently differentiated from one other, as patients with CCHS have mutations in the PHOX2B gene, whereas ROHHAD patients do not.

== Society and culture ==
The ROHHAD Association is an organization that aims to increase awareness for ROHHAD and promote research opportunities. They also organized fundraisers and events in order to give to researchers and promote visibility of ROHHAD. ROHHAD Fight Inc is a charity that was created for Marisa, a child who was diagnosed with ROHHAD, with the goal of raising awareness for the condition.

== See also ==
- Central hypoventilation syndrome
- Obesity hypoventilation syndrome
- Hypoventilation
- Hypothalamus
- Rare disease
