= ZC4H2-associated rare disorders =

ZC4H2-associated rare disorders are pathogenic variants of ZC4H2 which are associated with a clinical phenotype. (Note: The expression of the ZC4H2 mutation is referred by some as "Wieacker-Wolff syndrome" in other publications appearing as "Miles-Carpenter Syndrome". These nomenclatures describe the phenotypes observed in some individuals with a deleterious mutation on the ZC4H2 gene but they do not accurately define the highly varied clinical presentations found among the affected population. Therefore the National Organization for Rare Disorders (NORD) refers to by its cause, as ZC4H2-Associated Rare Disorders (ZARD).)

ZC4H2 (Zinc finger Cys_{4}His_{2}-type) is a protein-coding gene located on the X-chromosome. This gene encodes a protein which is a member of the so-called zinc finger domain-containing protein family. There is currently very limited understanding about the ZC4H2 gene and its protein function.

The limited research published to date indicates that ZC4H2 is expressed at various developmental stages and is subject to X-inactivation in females. There are a few families and singletons (males and females) with pathogenic variants of ZC4H2 described in the medical literature. In the families the variants can be transmitted as an X-linked recessive trait, which means that the disorder is fully expressed predominantly in males, while their carrier female siblings are unaffected or much less severely affected. In contrast to these females, heterozygous de novo variants in ZC4H2 in singleton females can result in a specific phenotype.

The pathogenic variants of ZC4H2 may result in impairment of the central and peripheral nervous system through the impairment of neurologic development or synaptic plasticity. Studies in zebrafish showed that the homologue of human ZC4H2 is associated with the generation of a specific subset of central nervous system interneurons.

Besides the cases described in the current literature, an additional 46 diagnosed cases of males and females with ZC4H2 deficiency are known worldwide, constituting this an ultra-rare orphan disorder.

== Phenotypes ==
There is no clear prediction of the phenotypic expression but it is known that the disorder can be fully expressed in males, while the clinical presentation in singleton females who have a de novo variant can be very variable.

Patients with this condition can have several disabilities and health concerns, including a large array of neuromuscular and neurological manifestations. These can include:

- Arthrogryposis multiplex congenita (AMC)
- Muscular atrophy of pelvis and lower extremities
- Trunk hypotonia and decreased trunk stability
- Dysphagia
- Respiratory distress
- Joint dislocations of mainly hips
- Elevated muscular tone in lower extremities
- Spasticity
- Dystonia
- Autonomic storms
- Camptodactyly
- Apraxia of speech
- Oculomotor apraxia
- Cortical visual impairment
- Epilepsy
- Global developmental delay

To date, there is no cure or effective treatment for this condition, but a correlation has been observed between early therapeutic interventions and more favorable outcomes. The current approach consists of supportive therapies and medical interventions, including surgery to alleviate specific malformations.
