= Benthozoa =

Scientific classification
- Kingdom: Animalia
- (unranked): Benthozoa; Erives and Fritzsch, 2019

Clades
- Porifera; ParaHoxozoa

Synonyms
- Myriazoa Schultz et al., 2023

Clade of animals

Benthozoa or Myriazoa is a proposed crown clade including all living animals except Ctenophora.

This proposal is an alternative to the Porifera-sister hypothesis in which Porifera (sea sponges) are the sister group to Eumetazoa (all other animals, including Ctenophora).

== Etymology ==
The group name Benthozoa comes from the hypothesized transition of its early ancestors from an entirely holopelagic life cycle to one with a benthic adult form.

Schultz et al. proposed the alternative name Myriazoa (meaning "numerous animals") as a replacement that avoids assumptions about evolutionary novelties. They do not recognize morphological characters uniting Porifera to the Parahoxozoa, but found that patterns of gene distributions across chromosomes strongly support the occurrence of an irreversible group of changes in the shared ancestor of Porifera and Parahoxozoa but not in the ancestor they share with Ctenophora.

== Phylogeny ==
Ctenophores share multiple features with Parahoxozoa, including extracellular digestion, germ layers and a nervous system. However, it is notable that the "nervous system" is not chemically similar between ctenophores and planulozoans. The absence of these features in sponges implies either convergence between the two other groups, or their loss in Porifera.

The following cladogram is adapted from figure 4g of Schultz et al. (2023), although Nielsen (2019) notes that whether Cnidaria is considered sister to Placozoa or Bilateria varies among recent phylogenetic analyses.

- Choanozoa 950 mya
  - Choanoflagellata
  - Animalia 760 mya
    - Ctenophora
    - Benthozoa / Myriazoa
      - Porifera
      - Parahoxozoa
        - - Placozoa
          - Cnidaria
        - Bilateria
