= Bernd Fritzsch =

German-American neurobiologist

- Born: Bernd Fritzsch; Darmstadt, Germany
- Title: Distinguished neurobiologist

Bernd Fritzsch (born 1948) is a neurobiologist who studies how the vertebrate inner ear develops, how it evolved, and how it connects to the brainstem. He is a professor in the Department of Neurological Sciences at the University of Nebraska Medical Center (UNMC), which he joined in July 2023. He previously held faculty positions at Creighton University and the University of Iowa, where he chaired the Department of Biology from 2008 to 2016 and is professor emeritus.

His work in comparative molecular neuroembryology examines the genes that control the formation of hair cells, auditory and vestibular neurons, and their central targets, with the aim of identifying developmental steps relevant to restoring hearing. He was elected a Fellow of the American Association for the Advancement of Science in 2009 and a member of the German National Academy of Sciences Leopoldina in 2015.

== Education ==
Fritzsch studied biology at the Technical University of Darmstadt from 1968 to 1973 and completed his doctorate there in 1978, supported by a doctoral scholarship from the Studienstiftung des deutschen Volkes awarded in 1973. His doctoral research examined how the ear connects to the brain in mice and chickens. He completed his habilitation at Bielefeld University in 1985.

== Career ==
=== Germany and Scripps ===
Fritzsch was an assistant professor at TU Darmstadt from 1978 to 1981 and at Bielefeld University from 1981 to 1986. In this period he worked on the lateral line, electroreception and hearing in amphibians. He held a Heisenberg Fellowship from the German Research Foundation (DFG) from 1986 to 1990, and from 1988 to 1990 was a research fellow at the Scripps Institution of Oceanography, University of California, San Diego, where he worked with R. Glenn Northcutt on the electroreceptive and mechanosensory systems of the axolotl.

=== Creighton University ===
In 1991 he joined the Department of Biomedical Sciences at Creighton University in Omaha as an associate professor, becoming a full professor in 1993. He was Director of Basic Research from 2003 to 2008 and assistant dean for research at the medical school from 2004 to 2007. His research has been supported by the National Institutes of Health, the National Science Foundation, NASA and the German Research Foundation. In 2006 he and colleagues published a review of the molecular and developmental basis of the evolution of the vertebrate auditory system.

=== University of Iowa ===
Fritzsch moved to the University of Iowa in 2008 as professor and departmental executive officer (chair) of the Department of Biology, a post he held until 2016. During his tenure as chair, the department added six faculty members and obtained a multidisciplinary NIH P30 centre grant, and the average time to complete a graduate degree fell from about seven to under five and a half years. He was a co-investigator on that grant, the Iowa Center for Molecular Auditory Neuroscience (2010–2015). He held the Endowed Iowa Entrepreneurial Professorship from 2008 to 2010.

He was co-director of the university's Aging Mind and Brain Initiative from 2011 to 2014 and its director from 2014 to 2019, and director of the University of Iowa Center on Aging from 2014 to 2018. In 2014 he was named executive director of a pilot undergraduate science research programme in the Department of Biology, established with a US$1 million gift from Robert and Sue Latham. In 2016 he was named to the scientific advisory board of Decibel Therapeutics, a company developing treatments for hearing loss. He retired at the end of 2019 and became professor emeritus in 2020.

=== University of Nebraska Medical Center ===
In July 2023 Fritzsch joined UNMC as a professor in the Department of Neurological Sciences, where his laboratory studies ear and hair cell development, regeneration and evolution, as well as ear development in ageing. This work is funded by the National Institute on Aging and the National Institute on Deafness and Other Communication Disorders, and since retiring from Iowa he has been a co-principal investigator on an NIH grant studying age-related hearing loss.

== Research ==
=== Lateral line and electroreception ===
In 1995 Northcutt, Kurt Brändle and Fritzsch removed and transplanted embryonic placodes in axolotls and found that many of the placodes that form mechanosensory lateral line organs also give rise to electroreceptive ampullary organs.

=== Evolution of sensory systems ===
In 1987 Fritzsch reported a sensory structure in the inner ear of the coelacanth Latimeria that resembles the basilar papilla of tetrapods, and proposed that the two are homologous. A later anatomical study interpreted the coelacanth organ differently. He was a co-author of a 2026 study proposing that extinct coelacanths used an ossified lung to transmit sound to the inner ear. He was also a contributor to the 2013 sequencing of the sea lamprey genome. He has written correspondence in Science on the shared evolutionary origins of light and mechanical sensing (2005) and on electric organs (2014).

=== Eye muscle innervation ===
Fritzsch's early research addressed the development and evolution of eye muscle innervation. Working with Sten Grillner's group, he mapped the motor nuclei supplying the six eye muscles of the lamprey and found that, unlike in jawed vertebrates, the oculomotor nerve supplies only three of them (1990). In 1995, with Andrew McMahon's group, he reported that oculomotor and trochlear nerves and motoneurons could not be labelled in mice lacking Wnt1, concluding that without Wnt1 these neurons either fail to form or do not survive. A 1997 study he co-authored with McMahon's group provided evidence that FGF8 signalling from the boundary between midbrain and hindbrain controls the growth and patterning of the developing midbrain. In 2014 he was a co-author, with Elizabeth Engle's group, of a study showing that mice carrying the mouse equivalent of the most common human mutation in the kinesin KIF21A develop congenital fibrosis of the extraocular muscles, with stalling of developing oculomotor axons.

=== Inner ear development and hearing ===
Fritzsch's work on neurotrophins showed that mice lacking neurotrophin-3 lose all sensory neurons in the basal turn of the cochlea and many in the middle and apical turns (1997), and a 1997 review he led summarised how BDNF, NT-3 and their receptors support inner ear innervation. He has studied the transcription factors that produce hair cells and auditory neurons, showing that ears of Neurogenin 1 null mice form fewer hair cells and lack innervation (2000) and that NeuroD null mice are deaf because of a severe loss of inner ear sensory neurons (2001). In 2022 he and colleagues reported that mice lacking the transcription factor ISL1 in their auditory neurons had impaired hearing and a disrupted frequency (tonotopic) map in the auditory pathway. He co-authored reviews of auditory system development in the Annual Review of Neuroscience in 2002 and 2024.

=== Vestibular development in spaceflight ===
Fritzsch contributed to a study of rats flown on NASA's Space Shuttle during pregnancy, which found that prenatal spaceflight altered vestibular behaviour and the branching of gravity-sensing afferents in the offspring (2008).

== Books and edited works ==
- The Evolution of the Amphibian Auditory System (Wiley, 1988), first-named editor; based on a 1986 workshop at Bielefeld.
- Co-author, with Marlies Knipper and Eckhard Friauf, of the editorial introducing a 2015 issue of Cell and Tissue Research on the auditory system.
- The Primary Auditory Neurons of the Mammalian Cochlea (Springer, 2016; Springer Handbook of Auditory Research vol. 52), co-editor.
- The Wiley Handbook on the Aging Mind and Brain (Wiley-Blackwell, 2018), co-editor with Matthew Rizzo and Steven Anderson.
- The Senses: A Comprehensive Reference, 2nd edition (Academic Press, 2020), editor-in-chief of the seven-volume work.
- Evolution of Neurosensory Cells and Systems (CRC Press, 2022), co-editor with Karen L. Elliott.
- Sensing Sound: Evolutionary Neurobiology of a Novel Sense of Hearing (CRC Press, 2023), author.
- Contributing author to Clinical Neuroembryology, 3rd edition (Springer, 2023).

== Honours ==
- 1973: Doctoral scholarship, Studienstiftung des deutschen Volkes
- 1986: Heisenberg Fellowship, German Research Foundation
- 1991: John C. Kenefick Award, Creighton University
- 1993: Distinguished Research Career Award, Creighton University
- 2007: Outstanding Mentor Award, Creighton University
- 2008–2010: Endowed Iowa Entrepreneurial Professor, University of Iowa
- 2009: Fellow, American Association for the Advancement of Science
- 2015: Member, German National Academy of Sciences Leopoldina (Section Organismic and Evolutionary Biology)
- 2017: Collegiate Fellow, College of Liberal Arts and Sciences, University of Iowa

== Selected publications ==
- Fritzsch, B. (1987). "Inner ear of the coelacanth fish Latimeria has tetrapod affinities". Nature 327 (6118): 153–154. doi:10.1038/327153a0
- Fritzsch, B.; Sonntag, R.; Dubuc, R.; Ohta, Y.; Grillner, S. (1990). "Organization of the six motor nuclei innervating the ocular muscles in lamprey". Journal of Comparative Neurology 294 (4): 491–506. doi:10.1002/cne.902940402
- Fritzsch, B.; Nichols, D. H.; Echelard, Y.; McMahon, A. P. (1995). "Development of midbrain and anterior hindbrain ocular motoneurons in normal and Wnt-1 knockout mice". Journal of Neurobiology 27 (4): 457–469. doi:10.1002/neu.480270403
- Northcutt, R. G.; Brändle, K.; Fritzsch, B. (1995). "Electroreceptors and mechanosensory lateral line organs arise from single placodes in axolotls". Developmental Biology 168 (2): 358–373. doi:10.1006/dbio.1995.1086
- Lee, S. M. K.; Danielian, P. S.; Fritzsch, B.; McMahon, A. P. (1997). "Evidence that FGF8 signalling from the midbrain-hindbrain junction regulates growth and polarity in the developing midbrain". Development 124 (5): 959–969. doi:10.1242/dev.124.5.959
- Fritzsch, B.; Fariñas, I.; Reichardt, L. F. (1997). "Lack of neurotrophin 3 causes losses of both classes of spiral ganglion neurons in the cochlea in a region-specific fashion". Journal of Neuroscience 17 (16): 6213–6225. doi:10.1523/JNEUROSCI.17-16-06213.1997
- Ma, Q.; Anderson, D. J.; Fritzsch, B. (2000). "Neurogenin 1 null mutant ears develop fewer, morphologically normal hair cells in smaller sensory epithelia devoid of innervation". Journal of the Association for Research in Otolaryngology 1 (2): 129–143. doi:10.1007/s101620010017
- Kim, W. Y.; Fritzsch, B.; Serls, A.; et al. (2001). "NeuroD-null mice are deaf due to a severe loss of the inner ear sensory neurons during development". Development 128 (3): 417–426. doi:10.1242/dev.128.3.417
- Bermingham, N. A.; Hassan, B. A.; Wang, V. Y.; et al. (2001). "Proprioceptor pathway development is dependent on Math1". Neuron 30 (2): 411–422. doi:10.1016/s0896-6273(01)00305-1
- Fariñas, I.; Jones, K. R.; Tessarollo, L.; et al. (2001). "Spatial shaping of cochlear innervation by temporally regulated neurotrophin expression". Journal of Neuroscience 21 (16): 6170–6180. doi:10.1523/JNEUROSCI.21-16-06170.2001
- Rubel, E. W.; Fritzsch, B. (2002). "Auditory system development: primary auditory neurons and their targets". Annual Review of Neuroscience 25: 51–101. doi:10.1146/annurev.neuro.25.112701.142849
- Gu, C.; Rodriguez, E. R.; Reimert, D. V.; et al. (2003). "Neuropilin-1 conveys semaphorin and VEGF signaling during neural and cardiovascular development". Developmental Cell 5 (1): 45–57. doi:10.1016/s1534-5807(03)00169-2
- Matei, V.; Pauley, S.; Kaing, S.; et al. (2005). "Smaller inner ear sensory epithelia in Neurog1 null mice are related to earlier hair cell cycle exit". Developmental Dynamics 234 (3): 633–650. doi:10.1002/dvdy.20551
- Dabdoub, A.; Puligilla, C.; Jones, J. M.; et al. (2008). "Sox2 signaling in prosensory domain specification and subsequent hair cell differentiation in the developing cochlea". Proceedings of the National Academy of Sciences 105 (47): 18396–18401. doi:10.1073/pnas.0808175105
- Ronca, A. E.; Fritzsch, B.; Bruce, L. L.; Alberts, J. R. (2008). "Orbital spaceflight during pregnancy shapes function of mammalian vestibular system". Behavioral Neuroscience 122 (1): 224–232. doi:10.1037/0735-7044.122.1.224
- Smith, J. J.; Kuraku, S.; Holt, C.; et al. (2013). "Sequencing of the sea lamprey (Petromyzon marinus) genome provides insights into vertebrate evolution". Nature Genetics 45 (4): 415–421. doi:10.1038/ng.2568
- Cheng, L.; Desai, J.; Miranda, C. J.; et al. (2014). "Human CFEOM1 mutations attenuate KIF21A autoinhibition and cause oculomotor axon stalling". Neuron 82 (2): 334–349. doi:10.1016/j.neuron.2014.02.038
- Filova, I.; Pysanenko, K.; Tavakoli, M.; et al. (2022). "ISL1 is necessary for auditory neuron development and contributes toward tonotopic organization". Proceedings of the National Academy of Sciences 119 (37): e2207433119. doi:10.1073/pnas.2207433119
- Pyott, S. J.; Pavlinkova, G.; Yamoah, E. N.; Fritzsch, B. (2024). "Harmony in the molecular orchestra of hearing: developmental mechanisms from the ear to the brain". Annual Review of Neuroscience 47: 1–20. doi:10.1146/annurev-neuro-081423-093942
