= Obesity hypoventilation syndrome =

Breathing difficulties related to obesity

- Other names: Pickwickian syndrome
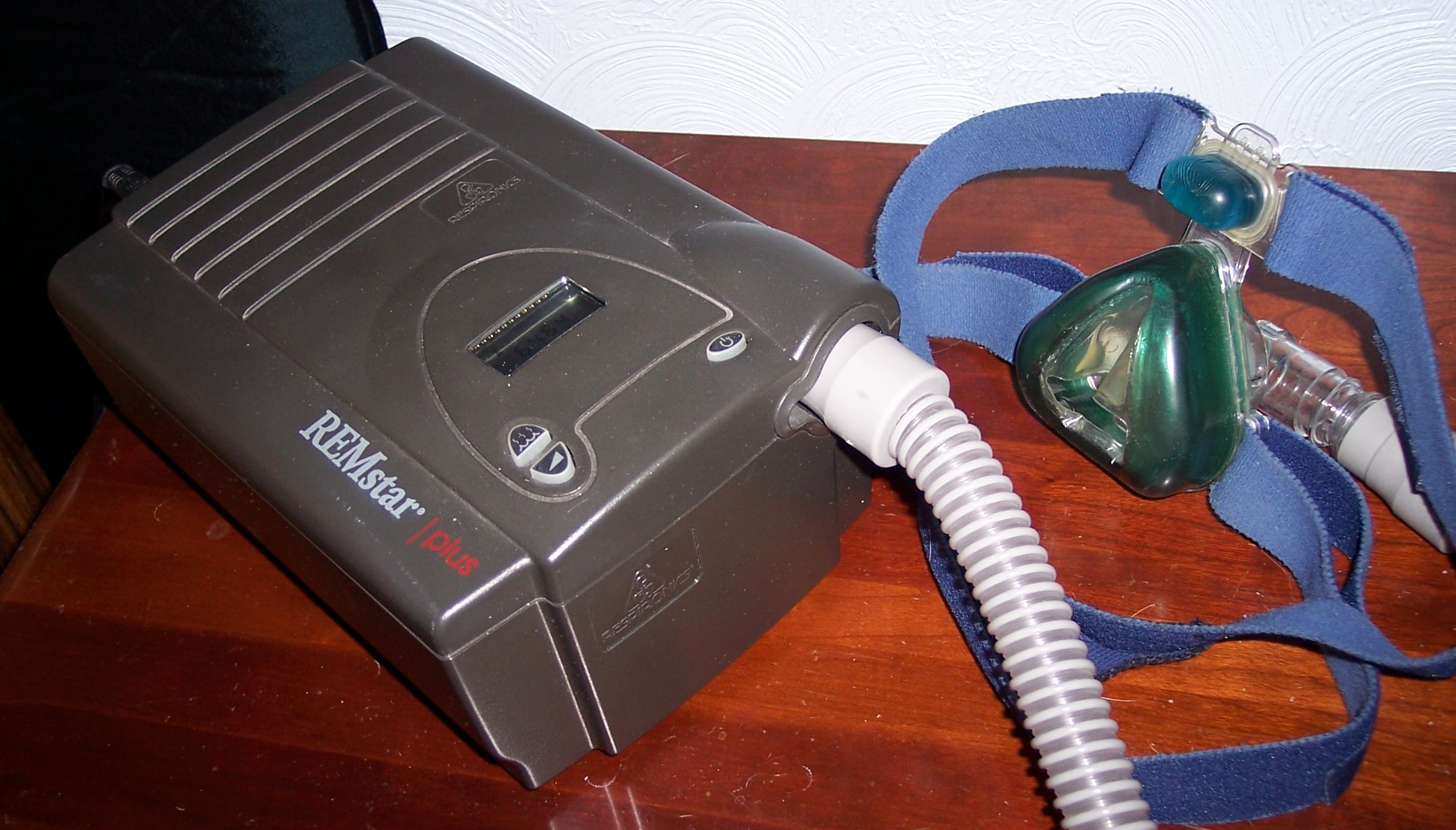
- Obesity hypoventilation syndrome often improves with positive airway pressure treatment administered overnight by a machine such as this device.
- Specialty: Respirology
- Risk factors: Obesity

Obesity hypoventilation syndrome (OHS) is a condition in which severely overweight people fail to breathe rapidly or deeply enough, resulting in low oxygen levels and high blood carbon dioxide (CO_{2}) levels. The syndrome is often associated with obstructive sleep apnea (OSA), which causes periods of absent or reduced breathing in sleep, resulting in many partial awakenings during the night and sleepiness during the day. The disease puts strain on the heart, which may lead to heart failure and leg swelling.

Obesity hypoventilation syndrome is defined as the combination of obesity and an increased blood carbon dioxide level during the day that is not attributable to another cause of excessively slow or shallow breathing.

The most effective treatment is weight loss, but this may require bariatric surgery to achieve. Weight loss of 25 to 30% is usually required to resolve the disorder. The other first-line treatment is non-invasive positive airway pressure (PAP), usually in the form of continuous positive airway pressure (CPAP) at night. The disease was known initially in the 1950s, as "Pickwickian syndrome" in reference to The Pickwick Papers.

== Signs and symptoms ==
Most people with obesity hypoventilation syndrome have concurrent obstructive sleep apnea, a condition characterized by snoring, brief episodes of apnea (cessation of breathing) during the night, interrupted sleep, and excessive daytime sleepiness. In OHS, sleepiness may be worsened by elevated blood levels of carbon dioxide, which causes drowsiness ("CO_{2} narcosis"). Other symptoms present in both conditions are depression, and hypertension (high blood pressure), which is difficult to control with medication. The high carbon dioxide can also cause headaches, which tend to worsen in the morning.

The low oxygen level leads to physiologic constriction of the pulmonary arteries to correct ventilation-perfusion mismatching, which puts excessive strain on the right side of the heart. When this leads to right-sided heart failure, it is known as cor pulmonale. Symptoms of this disorder occur because the heart has difficulty pumping blood from the body through the lungs. Fluid may, therefore, accumulate in the skin of the legs in the form of edema (swelling), and in the abdominal cavity in the form of ascites; decreased exercise tolerance and exertional chest pain may occur. On physical examination, characteristic findings are the presence of a raised jugular venous pressure, a palpable parasternal heave, a heart murmur due to blood leaking through the tricuspid valve, hepatomegaly (an enlarged liver), ascites and leg edema. Cor pulmonale occurs in about a third of all people with OHS.

== Mechanism ==
It is not fully understood why some obese people develop obesity hypoventilation syndrome while others do not. It is likely the result of an interplay of various processes. Firstly, work of breathing is increased as adipose tissue restricts the normal movement of the chest muscles and makes the chest wall less compliant, the diaphragm moves less effectively, respiratory muscles are fatigued more easily, and airflow in and out of the lung is impaired by excessive tissue in the head and neck area. Hence, people with obesity need to expend more energy to breathe effectively. These factors together lead to sleep-disordered breathing and inadequate removal of carbon dioxide from the circulation and hence hypercapnia; given that carbon dioxide in aqueous solution combines with water to form an acid (CO_{2}[g] + H_{2}O[l] + excess H_{2}O[l] --> H_{2}CO_{3}[aq]), this causes acidosis (increased acidity of the blood). Under normal circumstances, central chemoreceptors in the brain stem detect the acidity and respond by increasing the respiratory rate; in OHS, this "ventilatory response" is blunted.

The blunted ventilatory response is attributed to several factors. Obese people tend to have raised levels of the hormone leptin, which is secreted by adipose tissue and, under normal circumstances, increases ventilation. In OHS, this effect is reduced. Furthermore, episodes of nighttime acidosis (e.g., due to sleep apnea) lead to compensation by the kidneys with retention of the alkali bicarbonate. This normalizes the blood's pH. However, bicarbonate stays around in the bloodstream for longer, and further episodes of hypercapnia lead to relatively mild acidosis and reduced ventilatory response in a vicious circle.

Low oxygen levels lead to hypoxic pulmonary vasoconstriction, the tightening of small blood vessels in the lung to create an optimal distribution of blood through the lung. Persistently low oxygen levels causing chronic vasoconstriction lead to increased pressure on the pulmonary artery (pulmonary hypertension), which in turn puts strain on the right ventricle, the part of the heart that pumps blood to the lungs. The right ventricle undergoes remodeling, becomes distended, and is less able to remove blood from the veins. When this is the case, raised hydrostatic pressure leads to accumulation of fluid in the skin (edema), and in more severe cases, the liver and the abdominal cavity.

The chronically low oxygen levels in the blood also lead to increased release of erythropoietin and the activation of erythropoeisis, the production of red blood cells. This results in polycythemia, abnormally increased numbers of circulating red blood cells and an elevated hematocrit.

== Diagnosis ==
Formal criteria for diagnosis of OHS are:

- Body mass index over 30 kg/m^{2} (a measure of obesity, obtained by taking one's weight in kilograms and dividing it by one's height in meters squared)
- Arterial carbon dioxide level over 45 mmHg or 6.0 kPa as determined by arterial blood gas measurement
- No alternative explanation for hypoventilation, such as use of narcotics, severe obstructive or interstitial lung disease, severe chest wall disorders such as kyphoscoliosis, severe hypothyroidism (underactive thyroid), neuromuscular disease or congenital central hypoventilation syndrome

If OHS is suspected, various tests are required to confirm it. The most important initial test is the demonstration of elevated carbon dioxide in the blood. This requires an arterial blood gas determination, which involves taking a blood sample from an artery, usually the radial artery. Given that it would be complicated to perform this test on every patient with sleep-related breathing problems, some suggest that measuring bicarbonate levels in normal (venous) blood would be a reasonable screening test. If this is elevated (27 mmol/L or higher), blood gases should be measured.

To distinguish various subtypes, polysomnography is required. This usually requires brief admission to a hospital with a specialized sleep medicine department where several different measurements are conducted while the subject is asleep; this includes electroencephalography (electronic registration of electrical activity in the brain), electrocardiography (same for electrical activity in the heart), pulse oximetry (measurement of oxygen levels) and often other modalities. Blood tests are also recommended for the identification of hypothyroidism and polycythemia.

To distinguish between OHS and various other lung diseases that can cause similar symptoms, medical imaging of the lungs (such as a chest X-ray or CT/CAT scan), spirometry, electrocardiography and echocardiography may be performed. Echo- and electrocardiography may also show strain on the right side of the heart caused by OHS, and spirometry may show a restrictive pattern related to obesity.

=== Classification ===
Obesity hypoventilation syndrome is a form of sleep disordered breathing. Two subtypes are recognized, depending on the nature of disordered breathing detected on further investigations. The first is OHS in the context of obstructive sleep apnea; this is confirmed by the occurrence of 5 or more episodes of apnea, hypopnea, or respiratory-related arousals per hour (high apnea-hypopnea index) during sleep. The second is OHS primarily due to "sleep hypoventilation syndrome"; this requires a rise of CO_{2} levels by 10 mmHg (1.3 kPa) after sleep compared to awake measurements and overnight drops in oxygen levels without simultaneous apnea or hypopnea. Overall, 90% of all people with OHS fall into the first category, and 10% into the second.

== Treatment ==
In people with stable OHS, the most important treatment is weight loss—by diet, through exercise, with medication, or sometimes weight loss surgery (bariatric surgery). This has been shown to improve the symptoms of OHS and the resolution of the high carbon dioxide levels. Weight loss may take a long time and is not always effective. If the symptoms are significant, nighttime positive airway pressure (PAP) treatment is tried; this involves the use of a machine to assist with breathing. PAP exists in various forms, and the ideal strategy is uncertain. Some medications have been tried to stimulate breathing or correct underlying abnormalities; their benefit is again uncertain.

While many people with obesity hypoventilation syndrome are cared for on an outpatient basis, some deteriorate suddenly and, when admitted to the hospital, may show severe abnormalities such as markedly deranged blood acidity (pH<7.25) or depressed level of consciousness due to very high carbon dioxide levels. On occasions, admission to an intensive care unit with intubation and mechanical ventilation is necessary. Otherwise, "bi-level" positive airway pressure (see the next section) is commonly used to stabilize the patient, followed by conventional treatment.

=== Positive airway pressure ===
Positive airway pressure, initially in the form of continuous positive airway pressure (CPAP), is a useful treatment for obesity hypoventilation syndrome, particularly when obstructive sleep apnea coexists. CPAP requires the use during sleep of a machine that delivers a continuous positive pressure to the airways and preventing the collapse of the soft tissues in the throat during breathing; it is administered through a mask on either the mouth and nose together or if that is not tolerated, on the nose only (nasal CPAP). This relieves the features of obstructive sleep apnea and is often sufficient to remove the resultant accumulation of carbon dioxide. The pressure is increased until the obstructive symptoms (snoring and periods of apnea) have disappeared. CPAP alone is effective in more than 50% of people with OHS.

On some occasions, the oxygen levels are persistently too low (oxygen saturations below 90%). In that case, the hypoventilation itself may be improved by switching from CPAP treatment to an alternate device that delivers "bi-level" positive pressure: higher pressure during inspiration (breathing in) and a lower pressure during expiration (breathing out). If this too is ineffective in increasing oxygen levels, the addition of oxygen therapy may be necessary. As a last resort, tracheostomy may be necessary; this involves making a surgical opening in the trachea to bypass obesity-related airway obstruction in the neck. This may be combined with mechanical ventilation with an assisted breathing device through the opening.

=== Other treatments ===
People for whom first-line treatments fail or have very severe, life-threatening disease may sometimes be treated with tracheotomy, which is a reversible procedure. Treatments without proven benefit, and concern for harm, include oxygen alone or respiratory stimulant medications. Medroxyprogesterone acetate, a progestin, and acetazolamide are both associated with an increased risk of thrombosis and are not recommended.

== Prognosis ==
Obesity hypoventilation syndrome is associated with a reduced quality of life, and people with the condition incur increased healthcare costs, largely due to hospital admissions, including observation and treatment on intensive care units. OHS often occurs together with several other disabling medical conditions, such as asthma (in 18–24%) and type 2 diabetes (in 30–32%). Its main complication of heart failure affects 21–32% of patients.

Those with abnormalities severe enough to warrant treatment have an increased risk of death reported to be 23% over 18 months and 46% over 50 months. This risk is reduced to less than 10% in those receiving treatment with PAP. Treatment also reduces the need for hospital admissions and reduces healthcare costs.

== Epidemiology ==
The exact prevalence of obesity hypoventilation syndrome is unknown, and it is thought that many people with symptoms of OHS have not been diagnosed. About a third of all people with morbid obesity (a body mass index exceeding 40 kg/m^{2}) have elevated carbon dioxide levels in the blood.

When examining groups of people with obstructive sleep apnea, researchers have found that 10–20% of them meet the criteria for OHS as well. The risk of OHS is much higher in those with more severe obesity, i.e., a body mass index (BMI) of 40 kg/m^{2} or higher. It is twice as common in men compared to women. The average age at diagnosis is approximately 52 years. American Black people are more likely to be obese than American whites, and are therefore more likely to develop OHS, but obese Asians are more likely than people of other ethnicities to have OHS at a lower BMI as a result of physical characteristics.

It is anticipated that rates of OHS will rise as the prevalence of obesity rises. This may also explain why OHS is more commonly reported in the United States, where obesity is more common than in other countries.

== History ==
The discovery of obesity hypoventilation syndrome is generally attributed to the authors of a 1956 report of a professional poker player who, after gaining weight, became somnolent and fatigued and prone to fall asleep during the day, as well as developing edema of the legs suggesting heart failure. The authors coined the condition "Pickwickian syndrome" after the character Joe from Dickens' The Posthumous Papers of the Pickwick Club (1837), who was markedly obese and tended to fall asleep uncontrollably during the day. This report, however, was preceded by other descriptions of hypoventilation in obesity. In the 1960s, various further discoveries were made that led to the distinction between obstructive sleep apnea and sleep hypoventilation.

The term "Pickwickian syndrome" has fallen out of favor because it does not distinguish obesity hypoventilation syndrome and sleep apnea as separate disorders (which may coexist).
