= Diaphragm pacing =

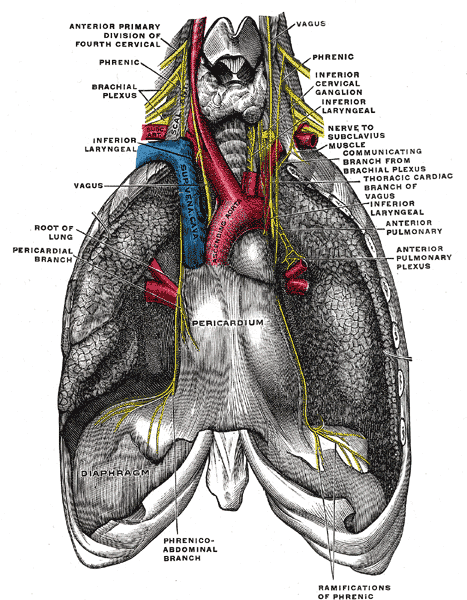
- Electrical stimulation of the phrenic nerve has been known to stimulate respiration for centuries.
- Other names: Phrenic nerve pacing

Diaphragm pacing (and earlier as electrophrenic respiration) is the rhythmic application of electrical impulses to the diaphragm to provide artificial ventilatory support for respiratory failure or sleep apnea. Historically, this has been accomplished through the electrical stimulation of a phrenic nerve by an implanted receiver/electrode, though today an alternative option of attaching percutaneous wires to the diaphragm exists.

== History ==
The idea of stimulating the diaphragm through the phrenic nerve was first firmly postulated by German physician Christoph Wilhelm Hufeland, who in 1783 proposed that such a technique could be applied as a treatment for asphyxia. French neurologist Duchenne de Boulogne made a similar proposal in 1855, though neither of them tested it. It was not until a year later that Hugo Wilhelm von Ziemssen demonstrated diaphragm pacing on a 27-year-old woman asphyxiated on charcoal fumes by rhythmically faradizing her phrenic nerves, saving her life. In 1872, Duchenne declared the technique the "best means of imitating natural respiration". However, advances in mechanical ventilation by the likes of George Poe in the early twentieth century ended up being initially favored over phrenic nerve stimulation.

Harvard researchers Sarnoff et al. revisited diaphragm pacing via the phrenic nerve in 1948, publishing their experimental results on dogs. In a separate publication a few days before, the same group also revealed they had an opportunity to use the technique "on a five-year-old boy with complete respiratory paralysis following rupture of a cerebral aneurysm". Referring to the process as "electrophrenic respiration", Sarnoff was able to artificially respirate the young boy for 52 hours. The technology behind diaphragm pacing was advanced further in 1968 with the publication of doctors John P. Judson and William W. L. Glenn's research on the use of radio-frequency transmission to at whim "adjust the amplitude of stimulation and to control the rate of stimulation externally". Teaming up with Avery Laboratories, Glenn brought his prototype device to the commercial market in the early 1970s. The Avery Breathing Pacemaker received pre-market approval from the FDA in 1987 for "chronic ventilatory support because of upper motor neuron respiratory muscle paralysis" in patients of all ages. In the 1980s, "sequential multipole stimulation" was developed in Tampere, Finland. This technology was commercialized as the Atrostim PNS system and became commercially available in Europe in 1990.

By the early 1990s, long-term evaluations of the technology were being published, with some researchers such as Bach and O'Connor stating that phrenic nerve pacing is a valid option "for the properly screened patient but that expense, failure rate, morbidity, and mortality remain excessive and that alternative methods of ventilatory support should be explored". Others such as Brouillette and Marzocchi suggested that advances in encapsulation and electrode technologies could improve system longevity and reduce damage to diaphragm muscle. New surgical techniques such as a thoracoscopic approach began to appear in the late 1990s.

In the mid-2000s, U.S. company Synapse Biomedical began researching a new diaphragm pacing system that would not have to attach to the phrenic nerve, but instead depended on "four electrodes implanted in the muscle of the diaphragm to electronically stimulate contraction". The marketed NeuRx device received several FDA approvals under a Humanitarian Device Exemption (HDE), one in 2008 and another in 2011.

== Methodology and devices ==
The basic principle behind a diaphragm pacing device (the U.S. Food and Drug Administration identifies the device as a "diaphragmatic/phrenic nerve stimulator") involves passing an electric current through electrodes that are attached internally. The diaphragm contracts, expanding the chest cavity, and causing air to be sucked into the lungs (inspiration). When not stimulated, the diaphragm relaxes and air moves out of the lungs (expiration).

According to the United States Medicare system, phrenic nerve stimulators are indicated for "selected patients with partial or complete respiratory insufficiency" and "can be effective only if the patient has an intact phrenic nerve and diaphragm". Common patient diagnoses for phrenic nerve pacing include patients with spinal cord injury, central sleep apnea, congenital central hypoventilation syndrome (i.e., Ondine's curse), and diaphragm paralysis.

There are currently three commercially distributed diaphragm pacing devices: Synapse Biomedical, Inc.'s NeuRx (US), Avery Biomedical Devices, Inc.'s Mark IV Breathing Pacemaker (US), and Atrotech OY's Atrostim PNS (Finland). The Synapse and Avery devices are distributed worldwide and approved for use in the United States. The Atrotech device is not available in the U.S. As of December 2019, FDA premarket approval was given to Avery's Spirit Transmitter Device, replacing the Mark IV transmitter.

In May 2020, Canadian company Lungpacer Medical received approval for emergency use by the USFDA amid the COVID-19 pandemic.

== Surgical procedure ==
In the case of the Atrostim and Mark IV devices, several surgical techniques may be used. Surgery is typically performed by placing an electrode around the phrenic nerve, either in the neck (i.e., cervically; an older technique), or in the chest (i.e., thoracically; more modern). This electrode is connected to a radiofrequency receiver which is implanted just under the skin. An external transmitter sends radio signals to the device by an antenna that is worn over the receiver. For the cervical surgical technique, the phrenic nerve is approached via a small (~5 cm) incision slightly above, and midline to, the clavic. The phrenic nerve is then isolated under the scalenus anticus muscle. For the thoracic surgical technique, a small (~5 cm) incisions over the second or third intercostal space. The electrodes are placed around the phrenic nerves alongside the pericardium. The use of a thorascope allows for this technique to be performed in a minimally-invasive manner.

In the case of the NeuRx device, a series of four incisions are made in the abdominal skin. Several tools such as a laparoscope and probe are used to find the best four locations on the diaphragm to attach four electrodes, which have connections outside the body. A fifth electrode is placed just under the skin in the same area. All these connect to the device.

== Research ==
Research into the efficacy of diaphragmatic pacing (DP) for ventilatory support has had mixed results, that depend largely on the disease process of the patient population being studied.

Numerous studies have shown that DP can be a very effective tool for patients with spinal cord injuries (SCI). One retrospective long-term multivariate analysis of patients with cervical SCI injuries, found that DP produced better survival rates and updated self-reported quality of life ratings than did the use of mechanical ventilation (MV).

According to a number of high profile studies, diaphragm pacing should not be used to treat respiratory failure in patients with Amyotrophic Lateral Sclerosis (ALS). Studies have demonstrated a significantly higher mortality rate in patients with activated DP implants, than those who received the traditional MV for treatment in later stages of ALS. There have been virtually no clinical trials published on the efficacy of DP in patients with ALS since around 2016, due to the results of the DiPALS study, that showed a mortality rate of 76% of patients with the implant compared to 51% of patients who received MV alone. The USA has allowed the implementation of DP for patients with ALS using a "Compassionate Authorization", but Europe has stopped all authorization for DP in patients with ALS.
