= PHOX2A =

Protein-coding gene in humans

Identifiers
- Aliases: PHOX2A, ARIX, CFEOM2, FEOM2, NCAM2, PMX2A, paired like homeobox 2a
- External IDs: OMIM: 602753; MGI: 106633; GeneCards: PHOX2A

Gene location (Human)
Chr.	Chromosome 11 (human)
Band	11q13.4	Start	72,239,077 bp
Band	11q13.4	End	72,245,664 bp

Gene location (Mouse)
Chr.	Chromosome 7 (mouse)
Band	7 E2|7 54.66 cM	Start	101,467,520 bp
Band	7 E2|7 54.66 cM	End	101,471,933 bp
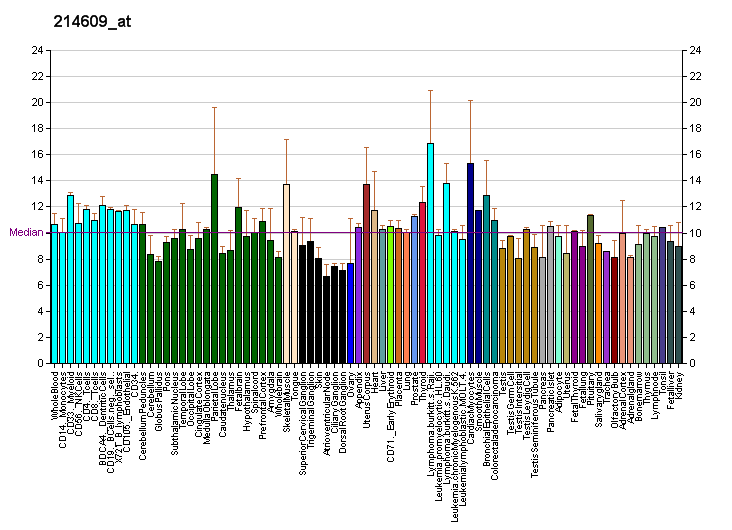
RNA expression pattern
Bgee	Human / Mouse (ortholog); Top expressed in: testicle; gonad; muscle layer of sigmoid colon; cecum; appendix; superior vestibular nucleus; gastric mucosa; right adrenal gland; transverse colon; muscle tissue / Top expressed in: superior cervical ganglion; external carotid artery; enteric nervous system; female urethra; internal carotid artery; adrenal gland; epithelium of female urethra; parasympathetic nervous system; tail of embryo; embryo; More reference expression data
BioGPS	More reference expression data
Gene ontology
Molecular function	DNA-binding transcription factor activity; DNA binding; sequence-specific DNA binding; RNA polymerase II transcription regulatory region sequence-specific DNA binding; DNA-binding transcription factor activity, RNA polymerase II-specific
Cellular component	nucleus
Biological process	somatic motor neuron differentiation; parasympathetic nervous system development; regulation of respiratory gaseous exchange; dopaminergic neuron differentiation; noradrenergic neuron differentiation; locus ceruleus development; trochlear nerve formation; regulation of transcription, DNA-templated; sympathetic nervous system development; oculomotor nerve formation; transcription, DNA-templated; midbrain development; positive regulation of transcription by RNA polymerase II; nervous system development; autonomic nervous system development; enteric nervous system development
Sources:Amigo / QuickGO
Orthologs
Databases	NCBI: entry; OMA: entry
Species	Human	Mouse
Entrez	401	11859
Ensembl	ENSG00000165462	ENSMUSG00000007946
UniProt	O14813	Q62066
RefSeq (mRNA)	NM_005169	NM_008887
RefSeq (protein)	NP_005160	NP_032913
Location (UCSC)	Chr 11: 72.24 – 72.25 Mb	Chr 7: 101.47 – 101.47 Mb
PubMed search
- Wikidata
View/Edit Human	View/Edit Mouse

Paired mesoderm homeobox protein 2A is a protein that in humans is encoded by the PHOX2A gene.

== Function ==
The protein encoded by this gene contains a paired-like homeodomain most similar to that of the Drosophila aristaless gene product. This protein is expressed specifically in noradrenergic cell types. It regulates the expression of tyrosine hydroxylase and dopamine beta-hydroxylase, two catecholaminergic biosynthetic enzymes essential for the differentiation and maintenance of noradrenergic phenotype. Mutations in this gene have been associated with autosomal recessive congenital fibrosis of the extraocular muscles (CFEOM2).

== Interactions ==
PHOX2A has been shown to interact with HAND2.

== See also ==
PHOX2B
