= RNF220 =

Protein-coding gene in humans

Identifiers
- Aliases: RNF220, C1orf164, ring finger protein 220, HLD23
- External IDs: OMIM: 616136; MGI: 1913993; GeneCards: RNF220
Enzyme activity
EC #	BRENDA	ExPASy	KEGG	MetaCyc
2.3.2.27	↗	↗	↗	↗

Gene location (Human)
Chr.	Chromosome 1 (human)
Band	1p34.1	Start	44,405,194 bp
Band	1p34.1	End	44,651,724 bp

Gene location (Mouse)
Chr.	Chromosome 4 (mouse)
Band	4|4 D1	Start	117,128,660 bp
Band	4|4 D1	End	117,354,249 bp
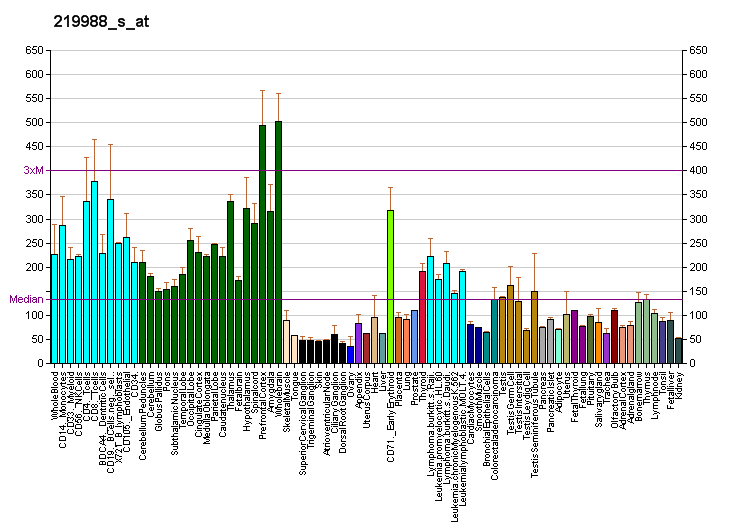
RNA expression pattern
Bgee	Human / Mouse (ortholog); Top expressed in: C1 segment; prefrontal cortex; right frontal lobe; anterior cingulate cortex; corpus callosum; right hemisphere of cerebellum; Brodmann area 9; granulocyte; nucleus accumbens; amygdala / Top expressed in: tail of embryo; zygote; genital tubercle; spermatid; CA3 field; superior frontal gyrus; dentate gyrus of hippocampal formation granule cell; perirhinal cortex; neural layer of retina; entorhinal cortex; More reference expression data
BioGPS	More reference expression data
Gene ontology
Molecular function	protein binding; metal ion binding; ubiquitin protein ligase activity; ubiquitin-protein transferase activity; transferase activity
Cellular component	cytoplasm
Biological process	protein autoubiquitination; protein ubiquitination; positive regulation of canonical Wnt signaling pathway
Sources:Amigo / QuickGO
Orthologs
Databases	NCBI: entry; OMA: entry
Species	Human	Mouse
Entrez	55182	66743
Ensembl	ENSG00000187147	ENSMUSG00000028677
UniProt	Q5VTB9	Q6PDX6
RefSeq (mRNA)	NM_018150; NM_001319956; NM_001319957; NM_001376486; NM_001376487 NM_001376488; NM_001376489; NM_016501	NM_025739; NM_001310729; NM_001310730; NM_001310731
RefSeq (protein)	NP_001306885; NP_001306886; NP_060620; NP_001363415; NP_001363416 NP_001363417; NP_001363418	NP_001297658; NP_001297659; NP_001297660; NP_080015
Location (UCSC)	Chr 1: 44.41 – 44.65 Mb	Chr 4: 117.13 – 117.35 Mb
PubMed search
- Wikidata
View/Edit Human	View/Edit Mouse

RING finger protein 220 is a protein that in humans is encoded by the RNF220 gene.
