= PHOX2B =

Protein-coding gene in the species Homo sapiens

Identifiers
- Aliases: PHOX2B, NBLST2, NBPhox, PMX2B, paired like homeobox 2b, CCHS
- External IDs: OMIM: 603851; MGI: 1100882; GeneCards: PHOX2B

Gene location (Human)
Chr.	Chromosome 4 (human)
Band	4p13	Start	41,744,082 bp
Band	4p13	End	41,748,725 bp

Gene location (Mouse)
Chr.	Chromosome 5 (mouse)
Band	5 C3.1|5 35.95 cM	Start	67,251,742 bp
Band	5 C3.1|5 35.95 cM	End	67,256,644 bp
RNA expression pattern
Bgee	Human / Mouse (ortholog); Top expressed in: muscle layer of sigmoid colon; buccal mucosa cell; dorsal motor nucleus of vagus nerve; inferior olivary nucleus; rectum; transverse colon; appendix; small intestine; right adrenal gland; duodenum / Top expressed in: migratory enteric neural crest cell; external carotid artery; pelvic ganglion; enteric nervous system; internal carotid artery; adrenal gland; facial motor nucleus; female urethra; medial vestibular nucleus; male urethra; More reference expression data
BioGPS	n/a
Gene ontology
Molecular function	sequence-specific DNA binding; RNA polymerase II transcription regulatory region sequence-specific DNA binding; RNA polymerase II cis-regulatory region sequence-specific DNA binding; DNA binding; DNA-binding transcription activator activity, RNA polymerase II-specific; DNA-binding transcription factor activity, RNA polymerase II-specific
Cellular component	nucleus; nucleoplasm
Biological process	negative regulation of cell population proliferation; glial cell differentiation; respiratory system development; positive regulation of G2/M transition of mitotic cell cycle; medullary reticular formation development; transcription, DNA-templated; parasympathetic nervous system development; regulation of respiratory gaseous exchange by nervous system process; noradrenergic neuron development; cellular response to BMP stimulus; multicellular organism development; neural crest cell migration involved in autonomic nervous system development; hindbrain tangential cell migration; sympathetic nervous system development; skeletal muscle cell differentiation; enteric nervous system development; retrotrapezoid nucleus neuron differentiation; regulation of gene expression; positive regulation of neuron differentiation; brainstem development; inner ear development; cell development; regulation of transcription, DNA-templated; sympathetic ganglion development; negative regulation of neuron differentiation; cell differentiation in hindbrain; autonomic nervous system development; efferent axon development in a lateral line nerve; neuron differentiation; neuron migration; dopaminergic neuron differentiation; noradrenergic neuron differentiation; positive regulation of transcription by RNA polymerase II; transcription by RNA polymerase II; positive regulation of cold-induced thermogenesis; nervous system development
Sources:Amigo / QuickGO
Orthologs
Databases	NCBI: entry; OMA: entry
Species	Human	Mouse
Entrez	8929	18935
Ensembl	ENSG00000109132	ENSMUSG00000012520
UniProt	Q99453	O35690
RefSeq (mRNA)	NM_003924	NM_008888
RefSeq (protein)	NP_003915	NP_032914
Location (UCSC)	Chr 4: 41.74 – 41.75 Mb	Chr 5: 67.25 – 67.26 Mb
PubMed search
- Wikidata
View/Edit Human	View/Edit Mouse

Paired-like homeobox 2b (PHOX2B), also known as neuroblastoma Phox (NBPhox), is a protein that in humans is encoded by the PHOX2B gene located on chromosome 4.

It codes for a homeodomain transcription factor. It is expressed exclusively in the nervous system, in most neurons that control the viscera (cardiovascular, digestive and respiratory systems). It is also required for their differentiation.

== Immunohistochemistry ==
Essential for the differentiation and survival of sympathetic neurons and chromaffin cells, the transcription factor PHOX2B is highly specific for the peripheral autonomic nervous system. Neuroblasts are derived from sympathoadrenal lineage neural crest cells and therefore require and constitutively express PHOX2B. PHOX2B immunohistochemical staining, as a marker of neural crest derivation, has been shown to be sensitive and specific for undifferentiated neuroblastoma, enabling identification where other markers fail to recognize neuroblastoma among various different small round blue cell tumors of childhood.

The diagnostic utility of PHOX2B staining extends to later stages of differentiation. Its strength and specificity can detect the small foci of neuroblastic tumors metastatic to the bone marrow, an identification critical for determining disease staging. PHOX2B staining also overcomes frequent obstacles to neuroblastoma detection in post-treatment samples, which frequently exhibit dense fibrosis, prominent inflammatory infiltrates, and/or diffuse calcification.

== Pathology ==
Mutations in human PHOX2B cause a rare disease of the visceral nervous system (dysautonomia): congenital central hypoventilation syndrome (associated with respiratory arrests during sleep and, occasionally, wakefulness), Hirschsprung's disease (partial agenesis of the enteric nervous system), ROHHAD, and tumours of the sympathetic ganglia. In most people, Exon 3 of the gene contains a sequence of 20 polyalanine repeats. An increase in the number of repeats is associated with congenital central hypoventilation syndrome. There may also be other pathogenic mutations further along the gene.

== Research ==
Organisations involved in researching Phox2B include those concerned with Congenitial Central Hypoventilation Syndrome. These include Keep Me Breathing based in the UK and The CCHS Network based in the USA. The CCHS Network held a scientific conference in September 2023, which covered significant research into Phox2B and CCHS with Keep Me Breathing presenting, too.

== See also ==
PHOX2A
