= Wieacker syndrome =

- Other names: Intellectual disability-developmental delay-contractures syndrome
- This condition is inherited in an X-linked recessive manner.
- Specialty: Medical genetics
- Symptoms: Joint deformities, muscle degeneration, mild intellectual disability, impaired muscle movement
- Usual onset: Infancy
- Causes: Genetic mutations

First being described and identified in 1985, Wieacker-Wolff syndrome is a rare, slowly progressive, genetic disorder present at birth and characterized by deformities of the joints of the feet, muscle degeneration, mild intellectual disability and an impaired ability to move certain muscles of the eyes, face and tongue. Wieacker syndrome is inherited as an X-linked recessive trait.

The condition is characterized by contracture of the lower joints, muscle atrophy, impaired facial muscles, intellectual disability, and syndromic facies. Additional symptoms include stiffening of the muscles and joints of the feet, droopy eyelids, crossed eyes, farsightedness, and abnormal curvature of the spine. Depending on a person’s genotype, the severity of their symptoms will differ. For example, females tend to have milder signs of the disease, especially when heterozygous.

== Genetics ==
Wieacker syndrome is caused by a mutation in ZC4H2 on the X chromosome (Xq13-q21).

There are five affected families, each with different mutations to the ZC4H2 gene. Family one has a substitution of guanine (G) to a cytosine (C) at base pair position 187. This leads to an amino acid change at position 63, where a leucine replaces a valine. This phenotype is the most mild because mutation only alters the secondary structure of the protein. This leads to a less stable protein that is still fully functional.

Family two has a substitution of a guanine (G) to a adenine (A) at base pair position 593 which leads to an amino acid change from an arginine to glutamine. This phenotype is lethal at ages .5 to 8.0 years due to a change in the highly conserved zinc-finger domain which compromises the proteins function.

Family three also has a lethal phenotype. Family three has a substitution of a cytosine (C) to a thiamine (T) as base pair position 601. This leads to an amino acid change at position 201 from a proline to serine. This phenotype is lethal from ages 1.4 weeks to 13.0 weeks because it alters the highly conserved domain of the protein which compromises its function.

Families 4 and 5 have the same substitution of a cytosine (C) to thiamine (T) at base pair position 637. This leads to an amino acid change from arginine to tryptophan at amino acid position 213. This phenotype occurs near the highly conserved carboxyl terminus of the protein. This leads to an intermediate phenotype, where females are normal except for a developmental which has been hypothesized to be caused by varying X-chromosome inactivation.

== Diagnosis ==
In some instances in the history of the family in which the syndrome was first described, the syndrome was present at birth. The mutations were found by various methods, including whole genome sequencing, X-chromosome exome sequencing, and direct sequencing of the ZC4H2 gene: all mutations were confirmed by Sanger sequencing and segregated with the disorder in the families. There were three missense and one splice site mutations. The mutations were found by exome sequencing in some of the families.

== Management ==
Treatment of Wieacker syndrome is typically supportive and symptomatic due to the little information physicians have on the disease. Therapies such as physical therapy, surgery, speech therapy, and special education are typically used and have been beneficial for the impacted families. While these management techniques cannot fully treat the disorder, they can help reduce the negative results of the symptoms and aid the families in living a semi-normal life. Clinical trials are in development regarding the disorder as well, looking to better understand Wieacker syndrome and its possible treatments.

== Epidemiology ==
Wieacker syndrome has fewer than 30 confirmed cases, where it usually affects males, but some carrier females show mild manifestations of the disorder. As of 2015, the syndrome has been reported in five families. Prevalence and incidence rates are not fully known at this time but are spread across Germany, France, the Netherlands, Australia, and the United States.

In four generations of a Missouri kindred, Miles and Carpenter (1991) observed three brothers and a male cousin with intellectual disability in association with exotropia, microcephaly, distal muscle wasting, and 10 low digital arches. Six women who might represent heterozygotes were found to have 8 to 10 low digital arches; 5 of these women had exotropia.

A second family was found with a similar, but more severe phenotype. Affected individuals presented with neonatal respiratory distress, arthrogryposis multiplex congenita, muscle weakness, and ptosis, suggesting dysfunction of neuromuscular transmission in utero.

A third family identified by Hirata et al. (2013) had previously been reported by Hennekam et al. (1991). That family had five affected males in three sibships connected through females. Affected males had severe arthrogryposis and muscle weakness in the pre- and postnatal periods, resulting in death within the first weeks or months of life. The one surviving boy had severely impaired intellectual development.

May et al. (2015) reported three previously unreported families with X-linked syndromic intellectual disability. There were 10 affected males and 10 carrier females. There was phenotypic variability between the families, but all male patients had impaired intellectual development.

Frints et al. (2019) reported 11 males from 6 unrelated families (families 1, 4-6, 9, and 19) with WRWF. Two additional male patients (families 18 and 24) were sporadic cases with de novo missense variants. Some affected fetuses showed signs of the disorder in utero: these included clubfoot or rocker bottom feet, fetal hypo/akinesia, contractures, AMC, and nuchal edema.
