= Congenital fibrosis of the extraocular muscles =

- Other names: CFEOM

Congenital fibrosis of the extraocular muscles is a class of rare genetic disorders affecting one or more of the muscles that move the eyeballs. Individuals with congenital fibrosis of the extraocular muscles (CFEOM) have varying degrees of ophthalmoplegia (an inability to move the eyes in one or more directions) and ptosis. The condition is present from birth, non-progressive, runs in families, and usually affects both eyes similarly. In the most common form, the superior recti are dysfunctional and the inferior recti, lacking proper opposition, pull the eyes down, forcing the head to be tilted upward in order to see straight ahead.

There are three types of CFEOM, numbered 1-3. CFEOM1, the most common type, is now known to be caused by one of several mutations in the KIF21A gene, while CFEOM2 is caused by mutations in the PHOX2A gene. CFEOM3 is caused by mutations in the TUBB3 gene. CFEOM was first named in 1956, although papers describing conditions now known or assumed to be CFEOM appear in the medical literature as early as 1840. Due to its rarity, it has been independently cited numerous times under many different names.
