= Central hypoventilation syndrome =

Sleep breathing disorder

- Other names: Ondine's curse, primary alveolar hypoventilation, alveolar hypoventilation secondary to neurologic disease, idiopathic acquired central hypoventilation syndrome
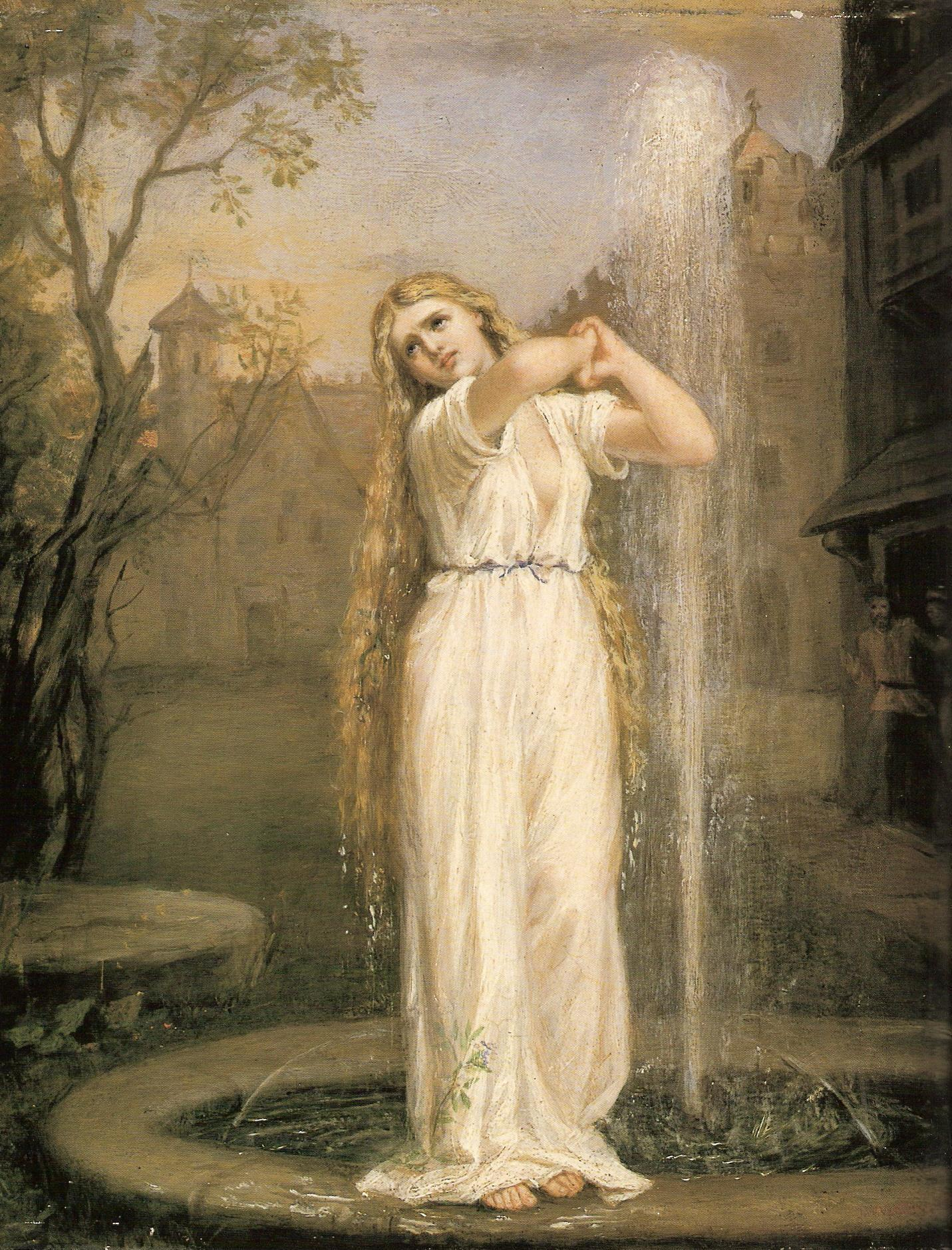
- Ondine by John William Waterhouse (1849–1917)
- Specialty: Neurology

Central hypoventilation syndrome (CHS) is a sleep-related breathing disorder that causes ineffective breathing, apnea, or respiratory arrest during sleep (and during wakefulness in severe cases). CHS can either be congenital (CCHS) or acquired (ACHS) later in life. The condition can be fatal if untreated. CCHS was once known as Ondine's curse.

ACHS can develop as a result of severe injury or trauma to the brain or brainstem. Congenital cases are very rare and involve a failure of autonomic control of breathing. In 2006, there were only about 200 known cases worldwide. As of 2008, only 1000 total cases were known. The diagnosis may be delayed because of variations in the severity of the manifestations or lack of awareness in the medical community, particularly in milder cases. However, as there have been cases where asymptomatic family members also were found to have CCHS, it may be that these figures only reflect those found to require mechanical ventilation. In all cases, episodes of apnea occur in sleep, but in a few patients, at the most severe end of the spectrum, apnea also occurs while awake.

Although rare, cases of long-term untreated CCHS have been reported and are termed late onset CCHS (LO-CCHS). There have, however, even been cases of LO-CCHS where family members found to have it have been asymptomatic. Again, lack of awareness in the medical community may cause such a delay. CCHS susceptibility is not known to be affected by sex or race.

== Signs and symptoms ==
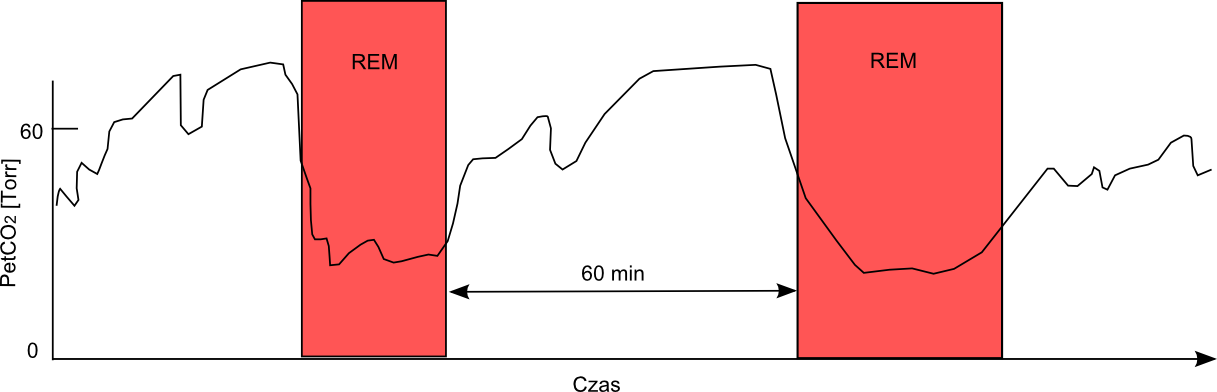
Carbon dioxide concentration of an 8-year-old boy with CHS during sleep

CHS is associated with respiratory arrests during sleep and, in some cases, to neuroblastoma (tumors of the sympathetic ganglia), Hirschsprung disease (partial agenesis of the enteric nervous system), dysphagia (difficulty swallowing) and anomalies of the pupilla. Other symptoms include darkening of skin color from inadequate amounts of oxygen, drowsiness, fatigue, headaches, and an inability to sleep at night. Patients with CHS also have a sensitivity to sedatives and narcotics, which makes respiration even more difficult. A low concentration of oxygen in the red blood cells also may cause hypoxia-induced pulmonary vasoconstriction and pulmonary hypertension, culminating in cor pulmonale or a failure of the right side of the heart. Associated complications may also include gastro-esophageal reflux disease (GERD), ophthalmological issues, seizures, recurrent pneumonia, developmental delays, learning disabilities, episodes of fainting, and temperature dysregulation.

== Causes ==
CHS is exhibited typically as a congenital disorder, but in rare circumstances, can also result from severe brain or spinal trauma or injury (such as after an automobile accident, stroke, asphyxiation, brain tumor, encephalitis, poisoning, as a complication of neurosurgery) or due to particular neurodegenerative conditions such as Parkinson's disease, multiple system atrophy, or multiple sclerosis. Long and Allen (1984) were the first to report the abnormal brainstem auditory evoked responses in an alcoholic woman who recovered from Ondine's curse. These investigators hypothesized that their patient's brainstem was poisoned — not destroyed — by her chronic alcoholism.

Medical investigation of patients with this syndrome has led to a deeper understanding of how the body and brain regulate breathing on a molecular level. PHOX2B, a transcription factor involved in the development of neurons, can be associated with this condition. This homeobox gene is important for the normal development of the autonomic nervous system.

The disease used to be classified as a "neurocristopathy", or disease of the neural crest because part of the autonomic nervous system (such as sympathetic ganglia) derives from the neural crest. However, this denomination is no longer favored because essential neurons of the autonomic nervous system, including those that underlie the defining symptom of the disease (respiratory arrests), are derived from the neural tube (the medulla), not from the neural crest, which may be the case in other mixed embryological origins and neurocristopathies.

== Diagnosis ==
Children with CCHS develop life-threatening episodes of apnea with cyanosis, usually in the first months of life. Medical evaluation excludes lesions of the brain, heart, and lungs but demonstrates impaired responses to build-up of carbon dioxide (hypercapnia) and decreases of oxygen in the circulation (hypoxia), the two strongest stimuli to regulate breathing rate.

Polysomnography shows that hypoventilation is most marked during slow-wave sleep. Specifically, infants with CCHS usually display lower tidal volumes during sleep, meaning they inhale less air during a normal breath. In the most severe cases, hypoventilation is present during other non-rapid eye movement sleep stages and even wakefulness. A subset of CCHS patients are at very high risk for developing malignant neural crest-derived tumors, such as neuroblastoma.

Sequencing of the gene PHOX2B revealed mutations in 91% of the cases within a French cohort.

Physicians unable to recognize the disorder should seek help from a neurologist and a pulmonologist. In some locations, such as France, optimal management of patients, once identified, has been aided by the creation of a national registry and the formation of a network of centers.

== Treatment ==
People generally require tracheostomy and lifetime mechanical ventilation on a ventilator in order to survive. However, it has been shown that biphasic cuirass ventilation can effectively be used without the need for a tracheotomy. Other potential treatments for CCHS include oxygen therapy and medicine for stimulating the respiratory system. Problems may arise with the extended use of ventilators, including fatal infections and pneumonia.

There are two primary organisations focused on delivering new treatments for CCHS. These are Keep Me Breathing, a UK based research charity which focuses solely on CCHS and The CCHS Network, a US based research charity which focuses the vast majority of its funding on CCHS scientific research.

== Prognosis ==
Most people with CCHS (unless they have the late onset form) do not survive infancy, unless they receive ventilatory assistance during sleep. An alternative to a mechanical ventilator is diaphragm pacing.

== History ==
CCHS was first described in 1962 by Severinghaus and Mitchell in three patients following surgery to the upper cervical spinal cord and brainstem.

== Etymology ==
Its name is a reference to the story of Ondine and Hans, characters in Ondine, a 1938 play by Jean Giraudoux based on traditions tracing back through Undine (a novella of 1811) to earlier European folk tales. The water-spirit Ondine tells her future husband Hans, whom she had just met, that "I shall be the shoes of your feet ... I shall be the breath of your lungs". Ondine reluctantly makes a pact with her uncle the King of the Ondine's that if Hans ever deceives her he will die. After their honeymoon, Hans is reunited with his first love Princess Bertha. Ondine leaves Hans in an attempt to protect him, but she is recaptured by a fisherman and Hans is stricken by the King's curse. On meeting Ondine again, Hans tells her that "all the things my body once did by itself, it does now only by special order ... A single moment of inattention and I forget to breathe". Hans and Ondine kiss, after which he dies.

Since being coined in 1962 the name has become controversial in medical literature, as later summaries frequently misunderstood the plot of Ondine and its connection to the diagnosis. Most frequently, Ondine was inaccurately blamed for cursing Hans, but other mistakes sometimes changed the nature of the curse itself. Such errors led to confusion in defining the medical condition.

== In popular culture ==
In season 7, episode 20 of Chicago Med titled "End of the Day, Anything Can Happen", a mob boss's daughter named Eva Corluka is diagnosed with a mild congenital form of this disease after exome genome testing post-appendectomy.

In the 1987 thriller film Black Widow, the villainess uses carefully formulated drugs to induce respiratory failure in her wealthy older male victims, making the cause of their deaths to appear to be due to Ondine’s curse.

== See also ==
- Our Curse, an Oscar-nominated 2013 short documentary film about a child with Ondine's curse
