= NIPPV =

NIPPV may refer to:

- Non-invasive positive pressure ventilation, a term used to distinguish non-invasive ventilation that does not use negative pressure (iron lung)
- Nasal intermittent positive pressure ventilation
