= Colin Sullivan =

Colin Sullivan may refer to:

- Colin Sullivan (physician), Australian physician, professor and inventor
- Colin Sullivan (footballer) (born 1951), English former footballer
- Colin Sullivan, character in The Departed
