= NCAS =

NCAS may refer to:

- National Centre for Atmospheric Science, a UK research centre
- National Clinical Assessment Service, a body dealing with UK healthcare professionals
- National Community Attitudes Survey, a survey and report published by Australia's National Research Organisation for Women's Safety
- National Consortium for Academics and Sports, a programme in the US using sport to effect social change
