= National Patient Safety Agency =

The National Patient Safety Agency (NPSA) was a special health authority of the National Health Service (NHS) in England. It was established in 2001 to monitor patient safety incidents, including medication and prescribing error reporting, in the NHS.

Since 1 April 2005 it had also overseen safety aspects of hospital design and cleanliness, as well as food (transferred from NHS Estates). This extended its remit to include safety in medical research, through the Central Office for Research Ethics Committees (COREC). Between 2005 and April 2012 it hosted the National Clinical Assessment Service that aims to help in resolving concerns about the performance of individual doctors and dentists. Finally, it also managed the contracts with the three confidential enquiries: National Confidential Enquiry into Patient Outcome and Death; Confidential Enquiry into Maternal Deaths in the UK; National Confidential Inquiry into Suicide and Homicide by People with Mental Illness. This responsibility was transferred from the National Institute for Health and Clinical Excellence.

As well as making sure that incidents are reported in the first place, the NPSA aimed "to promote an open and fair culture in hospitals and across the health service, encouraging doctors and other staff to report incidents and 'near misses'." In various publications it encouraged the creation of a "no-blame culture" to encourage staff to report incidents without fear of personal reprimand and know that by sharing their experiences others will be able to learn lessons and improve patient safety. Where a trend emerges relating to incidents then it issued reports, recommendations and guidance to avoid repetition.

The NPSA developed a National Reporting and Learning System (NRLS) to collect and analyse information from staff and patients, as well as incorporating information from other sources. From 2005 it was possible for staff to submit information through web-based forms, although the roll out of the system took two years longer than originally envisaged.

The last chief executive of the NPSA was Martin Fletcher. The chair was Philip Hunt, Baron Hunt of Kings Heath.

On 1 June 2012, the key functions of the NPSA were transferred to the NHS Commissioning Board Special Health Authority., later known as NHS England. In April 2016, the patient safety function was transferred from NHS England to the newly established NHS Improvement.

From 1 April 2019, NHS England and NHS Improvement are working together as a new single organisation to better support the NHS to deliver improved care for patients.
