= Philips Respironics =

Philips respiratory equipment division

Respironics
- Type: Subsidiary
- Industry: Medical
- Founded: 1976
- Founder: Gerald McGinnis
- Headquarters: Murrysville, Pennsylvania,
- Key people: Don Spence, President and CEO
- Products: respiratory equipment sleep aids
- Revenue: ▲$1.05 billion USD
- Number of employees: 4,900
- Parent: Philips
- Website: www.respironics.com

Respironics is an American medical supply company owned by Philips that specializes in products that improve respiratory functions. It is based in the Pittsburgh suburb of Murrysville in Pennsylvania, United States.

Some of its products had hazardous foam that disintegrated and entered patients' bodies. Company officials were aware of the defect, but continued to market them while the company withheld the vast majority of reports.

== History ==
In 1976, company founder Gerald E. McGinnis opened the company's first manufacturing facility for anesthesia masks near Pittsburgh, Pennsylvania. Initial product research and manufacturing were conducted in the founder's kitchen. Other early products included endotracheal and tracheostomy products.

McGinnis developed the "Nasal CPAP Mask System," a continuous positive airway pressure (CPAP) machine for the treatment of sleep apnea, based on the original 1981 design by Dr. Colin Sullivan. After receiving FDA approval in 1984, Respironics began selling the first commercially available CPAP machine a year later.

In 1988, the company went public under the stock ticker symbol RESP. In 1992, Respironics received a patent for bi-level technology. This technology was originally intended as an improvement on CPAP, however, its use has expanded into the treatment of other breathing disorders such as chronic obstructive pulmonary disease (COPD).

Other significant milestones included the acquisition of ventilator manufacturer LIFECARE International in 1996, sleep apnea competitor Healthdyne Technologies in 1998, and medical monitor and sensor leader Novametrix in 2002.

On December 21, 2007, Respironics announced it entered into a merger agreement with Philips, with Philips acquiring all shares of Respironics for $66 per share, for a total of approx $5.1 billion. On March 14, 2008, Philips announced completion of tender offer to acquire Respironics.

== Hazardous foam and product recall ==
A redesign of the CPAP devices from Respironics led to over a decade of complaints to Philips, which withheld the vast majority of them from the U.S. Food and Drug Administration (FDA). Around 2010, the company added industrial foam made of polyester-based polyurethane to silence rattling in the machine. But the foam could fall apart in heat and humidity, sending it into patients' noses, mouths, throats, and lungs. Among the chemicals released was formaldehyde, a potential carcinogen.

In 2023, replacement units and models were found to also emit detectable levels of formaldehyde.

Only in 2021 did Philips recall the machines, which had been delivered across the United States and many other countries. Over 3,700 complaints across more than 11 years were held back from the FDA, which device makers are required to do so within 30 days of reports of patient injuries in addition to investigating them. The company did not begin an internal investigation until 2019. The devices were used by children, the elderly, and over 700,000 U.S. veterans. As many as 15 million devices were affected. People experienced vomiting, dizziness, headaches, and cancers in the lungs, throat, sinuses, and esophagus. Company officials knew about the dangers of the device, but continued to market and sell them.

During the COVID-19 pandemic, the company ramped up production of another ventilator that also included the foam. Operating profits from the ventilators, including the CPAP devices, soared to around US$800 million/year. During the pandemic, Philips conducted a series of studies on the foam, showing the deteriorating foam and chemicals released by it, could cause "serious injury, life-threatening or permanent impairment".

The company stated that patients' health is its top priority and expressed regret for the "distress and concern" caused by the recall. It said complaints about the foam were limited and were evaluated on a case-by-case basis, and it was made aware of the significance in early 2021, launching the recall soon after. Months after the recall, Philips said that tests showed the chemicals released by the foam were within safe levels.

The company announced a new CPAP machine in April 2021, and soon after admitted that the foam it had used previously had been breaking down in an earnings call. Then-CEO Frans van Houten, in the earnings call, pledged 250 million euros to the problem, and reassured investors that the "device is safe to be continued to use to the best of our knowledge at this time". The company alerted the FDA but not customers. Following the recall, van Houten said he regretted the impact of it on "patients, care providers, and shareholders."

Multiple federal lawsuits have been levied against the company. One settled with the company for US$479 million to reimburse customers. This increased to US$1.1 billion in 2024. A shareholder class action remains outstanding.

== Today ==
Philips Respironics operates under a consent decree with the U.S. FDA and Department of Justice (DOJ) that bars the sale of new products in the United States. Outside the US, products include devices for the diagnosis and treatment of sleep apnea including CPAP and bi-level (BiPAP) non-invasive ventilation machines, oxygen concentrators for patients requiring supplemental oxygen, infant apnea monitors for infants at risk of SIDS, asthma treatment solutions and hospital ventilators.
