= Fred Cuny =

American humanitarian, missing person

- Born: Frederick Charles Cuny; November 14, 1944; New Haven, Connecticut
- Disappeared: April 15, 1995 (aged 50); Chechnya, Russia
- Status: Missing for 31 years and 3 months
- Spouse: Beth Roush Fernandez (married 1966–1968)
- Children: Craig Cuny

Frederick C. Cuny (November 14, 1944 – disappeared April 15, 1995) was an American humanitarian whose work spanned disaster relief, refugee emergency management, recovery from war and civil conflict, and peacebuilding. He was a practitioner, author, and a researcher. He has been described as “a great American – a sort of universal Schindler, a man with lists of millions of people in Asia, Africa, Latin America and Europe whose lives he succored or saved.” Beginning with Biafra and ending in Chechnya, he dedicated his career and his life to safeguarding vulnerable populations from disasters and protecting civilians caught in the maw of war.

== Early life and education ==
Frederick "Fred" Charles Cuny was born in New Haven, Connecticut. The family moved to Lake Charles, Louisiana, and later to Dallas, Texas, when Cuny was eight, where he grew up during the early stages of the Vietnam War. He obtained a pilot license while still in high school. He enrolled in the military cadet program at Texas A&M University, left before graduating, and later transferred to Texas College of Arts and Industries in Kingsville. While at Kingsville, he became interested in humanitarian work after visiting low-income neighborhoods in Mexico and witnessing immigrant farm workers living in South Texas. He later attended the University of Houston where he studied urban planning and received a bachelor's degree in political science in 1967.

After graduation, he worked in the small town of Eagle Pass, Texas, on the Mexican border in a project funded under President Johnson's War on Poverty. There he developed solutions to long-standing infrastructure and public health problems. Essential to Cuny’s success was his approach to grassroots participation, which later became a defining feature of his approach to humanitarian aid projects. After that, Fred worked with the Carter and Burgess Engineering firm in Fort Worth, Texas, where he was assigned to the construction project of the Dallas Fort Worth airport.

== Humanitarian assistance ==
Over his 26 year career, Cuny worked in crises in more than fifty countries, including Biafra, Guatemala, Bangladesh, Cambodia, India, Iraq, Kuwait, Somalia, Bosnia, and Chechnya.

=== Disaster reliefs ===
In 1970, when the Bhola Cyclone struck East Pakistan (now Bangladesh), Cuny was hired by the British NGO Oxfam to serve as an advisor in East Pakistan. He later described this assignment as 'life-changing' because it was there that he was first 'immersed' in the international disaster relief system. Since Intertect, his consulting company, was wholly dependent on outside contracts, these entities often included the same people upon whom his livelihood depended. Oxfam called upon him again after the earthquake near Managua, Nicaragua, in 1972. Oxfam asked him to plan a camp for the earthquake survivors; he used shelter units by forming a cluster around common spaces. Oxfam requested Cuny's assistance again with reconstruction after the Guatemala earthquake in 1976. Oxfam and its partner NGO, World Neighbors, asked Cuny to conceptualize a strategy for housing reconstruction. He responded with an approach called "Programa Kuchuba'l". Instead of rushing in construction materials from outside the region, he used local materials.

During the 1983–1985 famine in Ethiopia, Cuny conducted assessments of famine victims who had fled to Sudan from areas of Ethiopia that were affected by protracted drought, war and famine. They settled in camps around Showak and in the UN Food and Agriculture Organization camps in eastern Sudan. During this period, Cuny arranged to provide food to those who voluntarily repatriated in spite of opposition from the US government and UN representatives. In 1986, Cuny led an interagency assessment in Ethiopia that included the review of backup supplies and food availability. However, he extended the assessment to examine dependency problems. As the Soviet Union was beginning to collapse, in 1992, Cuny and Intertect provided assessment and planning in Mongolia, and in areas of Georgia, North Ossetia, Ingushetia, Dagestan and Chechnya.

=== Management and planning ===
Cuny began developing guidelines for camp management for refugees in 1970. He created his report on the Nicaragua camp plan in 1973. In 1979, Cuny was contracted to advise on the Kampuchean refugee camp in Thailand. Cuny's Assessment Manual for Refugee Emergencies informed USAID OFDA's set of guidelines; it is still in use as the Field Operations Guide. In 1991, the US military was called to provide humanitarian assistance but identified a problem of meeting the Kurds' needs in the mountains. Cuny was brought in to advise the US State Department and the military. Cuny proposed setting up safe zones in Northern Iraq and convincing the Kurds to return. The concept required establishing a humanitarian vanguard in Zakho, Iraq, still occupied by the Iraqi Army, and a series of demarches to the Iraqi military to withdraw. The operation was credited with saving thousands of lives.

Ambassador Marc Grossman, Deputy Chief of Mission in the US Embassy in Turkey at the time, recounted his involvement with what was known as Operation Provide Comfort:

Once we had established that safe zone in the north, just as Fred Cuny had predicted, 500,000 people went home. It was astonishing because plan B had been to set up nine or 10 massive refugee camps all along a valley in northern Iraq. Many people said that if that were the outcome, these would be the next Palestinians. Instead the Kurds went home.

In response to a developing famine in 1992 in Somalia, Cuny went to Somalia to set up a food supply program. He developed a set of recommendations for keeping a safe distance from Somalia's political hot spots and especially to avoid operating within the capital, Mogadishu. The plan was endorsed by former Ambassador Morton Abramowitz; however, Cuny was excluded from further planning. In October 1993, the US forces maneuvered a raid against Aidid's top lieutenants, which resulted in 18 American servicemen being killed.

When the 1986 El Salvador earthquake happened, the United States Agency for International Development Office of Foreign Disaster Assistance (USAID OFDA) hired Cuny. In a plan devised in conjunction with then president Duarte an approach centered on the El Salvador government purchasing unused land and building housing. USAID OFDA subsequently requested Cuny's help again after the 1988 Armenian earthquake. He insisted that a higher priority for the plastic sheeting USAID had brought was to provide temporary shelter for people to be used instead for stabling animals.

=== Protection ===
In Kuwait, in anticipation of the end of the Gulf War, Cuny was a member of an USAID OFDA team based in Kuwait that planned to go into Iraq at the war's conclusion, providing protection for groups in Kuwait expected to be blamed for the Iraqi invasion, and for Kurdish populations in the north of Iraq. . The siege had cut off Sarajevo's main supply of drinking water. Cuny and his team entailed custom-building several water filtration components in Houston, Texas. Each component was the size of a shipping container; designed to be transported in a C-130 transport airplane. All the components were flown into Sarajevo. When the filtration system started working in the summer of 1994, approximately 250,000 residents gained access to water in their homes, saving countless lives by avoiding the need for exposure to snipers and mortar fire when collecting river water or at open air collection points. . Cuny also brought in a team to resolve a disruption of natural gas into Sarajevo.

== Disappearance ==
=== Background assistance before disappearance ===
In late 1994, during the armed conflict in Chechnya, George Soros's Open Society Institute asked Cuny to help with an assistance assessment plan in Chechnya. Cuny arrived five weeks later. Tens of thousands of Chechens had already fled. However, many (mainly elderly Russians) were left behind. Cuny believed he could work with the Russian military and with Chechen rebels to evacuate the population.

Cuny returned to the United States in March 1995 and went public with a denouncement of Russia's brutal campaign. He wrote an article that appeared in late March in the New York Review of Books titled Killing Chechnya that was critical of the Russian military operation. High-level US government supporters of Cuny arranged for him to testify to officials in Washington. Cuny's objective in those briefings was to get someone in the US government administration to intercede with the Russians so that he could help evacuate the civilians trapped in the battlefield. However, no one came forward to take on that role.

=== Disappearance and searches ===
Cuny returned to his base of operations in Ingushetia, and on March 31, 1995, he traveled to Chechnya in a Russian ambulance with two Russian doctors and an interpreter. On April 4, Cuny and his three colleagues were captured by Chechens. His driver was released and returned to Ingushetia with a message from Cuny saying that he was "okay" and expected to be released soon. Cuny's presence is never reported again after this. By mid-April, searches for Cuny's disappearance were organized by the Open Society Institute, the US Embassy in Moscow, the FBI, the CIA, the Russian FSB (the former KGB) and the Chechen military. President Bill Clinton asked Boris Yeltsin, Russia's then-president, to assist with the search.

After several months of searching for Cuny, his son, Craig Cuny, and his brother, Chris Cuny, felt they had the information they needed to explain Cuny's disappearance. They received reports, believed to be reliable, that Cuny, the Russian interpreter and the two Russian doctors had all been executed near the village of Stary Atchkoi, a village controlled by the local Chechen intelligence chief.

There is a theory that the Chechen intelligence chief in Stary Atchkoi had Cuny and his team killed in order to take the money they were carrying. Another theory was that the Russian FSB had arranged the killing in retaliation for Cuny's outspoken criticism of Russia's brutal handling of the war. William Burns, the American diplomat who coordinated the U.S. Embassy's search for Cuny, concluded that "Cuny was likely caught in between two intelligence services—the Chechen who pulled the trigger and the Russians responsible for setting the trap." Another theory was that the Chechen President, Dzhokhar Dudayev, had ordered their killing because Cuny may have come upon Chechnya's secret possible possession of nuclear warheads. If Chechnya had these warheads, they could have been stored at a former ICBM installation on the edge of the village of Bamut, within just a few kilometers of where Cuny's convoy was initially apprehended and where Cuny's passport was later reportedly found by the Russian government. The bodies of Fred Cuny, his interpreter and the two doctors have not been found.

== Personal life ==
Fred Cuny married Beth Roush Fernandez in 1966. At the time, Beth had a three-year-old daughter from a previous marriage and the two had a son together in 1967. The couple divorced after two years, with Cuny gaining custody of his son, Craig. Cuny moved to Dallas with his son and never remarried.

== Legacy ==
=== The Cuny Centers and Other Institutions ===
Cuny established Intertect, an international assistance company, in 1987. After his disappearance, Intertect continued to operate under Fred's Deputy, Rick Hill, and was sold to International Resources Group, a company based in Washington DC, in 1997. Along with colleagues, Cuny began the non-profit Intertect Institute in 1992 founded to support and conduct research on key issues in humanitarian assistance. The Institute was renamed The Cuny Center for the Study of Societies in Crisis in 1998, and continued to operate until 2022. In 2022, The Cuny Center for the Study of Societies in Crisis was turned into the Fred Cuny Center for Peace and Conflict Studies based at the Rochester Institute of Technology in Kosovo (RIT Kosovo). Today, the Cuny Center is an academic and multidisciplinary hub that studies the causes, practices, and consequences of war and political violence, while promoting conflict management, resolution, and peacebuilding through education, research, and practical engagement with governments, civil society, and students.

In addition to the Cuny Center, Cuny conceptualized and co-founded the University of Wisconsin Disaster Management Center (DMC) in 1982. Having witnessed that the same mistakes made in one disaster would be repeated in the next, Cuny was inspired by the idea that DMC could play a role in professionalizing the field of disaster management. In 1985, the UN High Commissioner for Refugees (UNHCR) invited the DMC to develop technical training for their staff.

In 1994, before Cuny's disappearance, he and Morton Abramowitz, the president of the Carnegie Endowment for International Peace, conceptualized the creation of a permanent organization whose mission was to assess the plight of threatened populations then to mobilize the political will necessary to ensure a meaningful response. The organization was named the International Crisis Group (ICG) and Cuny was destined to become its first director of foreign operations though he was killed before he was able to assume this role. Around this time, Morton Abramowitz told Samantha Power (later to become US Ambassador to the United Nations) that Cuny "is a practical man. He doesn't just tell us 'something must be done.' He tells us what should be done and how we should to it. I've never known anybody like him."

=== Awards ===
Cuny was named a MacArthur Fellow in 1995 but disappeared before he could officially receive his award.

In 2008, The University of Michigan created the Fred Cuny Professorship in the History of Human Rights. At the announcement of the professorship, Robert Donia, the donor who funded it, said: "Of all the people I have encountered, Fred best embodied the values of human rights and international humanitarianism."

=== Documentaries and Publications in Memoriam ===
A 374-page book, The Man Who Tried to Save the World, by Scott Anderson, was published in 1999. It acted as a biography of Cuny’s legacy, while also telling and investigating the story of his disappearance. Author William Shawcross wrote Deliver us From Evil: peacekeepers, warlords and the world of endless conflict, published in 2000, in which he dedicated a prologue to Cuny titled "The World's Texan".

In 2015, Cuny's niece, Caroline Cuny, with Bryan Campbell, produced Looking for Trouble, a 22-minute tributary documentary dedicated to Fred Cuny.

Cuny also assembled a library of literature at Intertect. In 2017 The Cuny Center for the Study of Societies in Crisis, in conjunction with Texas A&M University (TAMU), arranged for the Intertect library to be catalogued and housed at TAMU's Cushing Memorial Collection as The Frederick C. Cuny/INTERTECT Collection (http://hdl.handle.net/1969.1/159819).

== See also ==
- List of people who disappeared mysteriously (2000–present)

== Bibliography ==
- Anderson, Scott (1999). The Man Who Tried to Save the World. New York, Doubleday, ISBN 0-385-48665-0.
- Anderson, Scott (February 25, 1996). What Happened to Fred Cuny, New York Times. Retrieved January 3, 2020.
- Davis, Ian (1995) Obituary: Fred C. Cuny, 1944 – 1995. London, Disasters Vol. 20, No. 1. doi:10.1111/j.1467-7717.1996.tb00517.x
- Cuny Frederick C (1983). Disasters and Development. New York, Oxford University Press. ISBN 0-19-503292-6.
- Cuny, Frederic C. Famine and Counter-Famine Operations. Dallas, Texas, Intertect. Retrieved December 29, 2019.
- Cuny, Frederick C., Richard B. Hill (1999). Famine, Conflict and Response: A Basic Guide. Kumarian Press. ISBN 9781565490901.
- Cuny, Frederick C. (June 1987). Training Syllabus for the UNHCR Emergency Managers Training Workshop, Madison, Wisconsin, University of Wisconsin Disaster Management Center. Retrieved December 29, 2019.
- Cuny Frederick C. Refugee Camps and Camp Planning. Report I: Camp Planning. Report II: Camp Improvements. Report III: Camp Development Programming. Report IV: Camp Layouts. Refugee Camp Planning: The State of the Art.
- Cuny, Frederick C. (June 1987). Training Syllabus for the UNHCR Emergency Managers Training Workshop, Madison, Wisconsin, University of Wisconsin Disaster Management Center.
- Jones, Sherry (October 14, 1997) Frontline: The Lost American, a transcript of the show. PBS. Retrieved January 3, 2020.
- Jones, Sherry (October 14, 1997) Frontline: The Lost American, a video. PBS. Retrieved January 3, 2020.
- Harrigan, Stephen (March 1985). Looking for Trouble, article in the Texas Monthly.
- Katz, Jesse (Aug. 18, 1995). Lone Ranger of Relief Aid Feared Slain in Chechnya: Disappearance: Hip-shooting humanitarian worker Fred Cuny may have run out of luck in a lawless land. Los Angeles Times.
- Kenney, George (July 8, 1999). Spy or Savior?. The Nation, Retrieved January 3, 2020.
- Paul, Diane (July 1999). Protection in Practice: Field-Level Strategies for Protecting Civilians from Deliberate Harm. London, Relief and Rehabilitation Network Overseas Development Institute. Retrieved December 31, 2019.
- RIT Kosovo. (2026). Fred Cuny Center for Peace & Conflict Studies website. Retrieved January 24, 2026.
- Rudd, Gordon W. (2004). Humanitarian Intervention: Assisting the Iraqi Kurds in Operation Provide Comfort, 1991, Department of the Army 2004. Retrieved January 2, 2020.
- Shawcross, William (2000). Deliver us from evil: peacekeepers, warlords and the world of endless conflict. New York, Simon & Schuster. ISBN 0-684-83233-X.
- Stein, Barry N., Frederick C. Cuny (October 12, 1992). Refugee Repatriation During Conflict A New Conventional Wisdom. The Center for the Study of Societies in Crisis. p. 11. Texas A&M University Libraries
