= Gerald McGinnis =

American medical device businessman (1934–2024)

- Born: Gerald Edward McGinnis; March 17, 1934; Ottawa, Illinois, U.S.
- Died: January 25, 2024 (aged 89)
- Education: University of Illinois Urbana-Champaign (BA in mechanical engineering, 1958); University of Pittsburgh (MA in mechanical engineering)
- Spouse: Audrey Lanz (m. 1961)
- Children: 3

Gerald Edward McGinnis (March 17, 1934 – January 25, 2024) was an American inventor and businessman who founded Respironics, a medical device company which sold the first mass-produced CPAP machines.

Born in Ottawa, Illinois, McGinnis studied mechanical engineering and eventually became a researcher for Westinghouse Electric while working on his master's degree at the University of Pittsburgh. He also researched endotracheal tube replacements at Allegheny General Hospital, eventually leaving in 1971 to create the medical device company Lanz Medical Products. After selling the company, McGinnis founded another medical device company called Respironics in 1976. In the early 1980s, the company developed a CPAP machine called the SleepEasy, receiving FDA approval in 1984. The machines were a commercial success and helped establish Respironics as a major player in the medical device industry.

== Early life ==
McGinnis was born on March 17, 1934, in Ottawa, Illinois, to Joseph McGinnis and Dora Gress. He was the youngest of seven children and his father worked in factories. At a young age, McGinnis washed bakery trays to earn money and tinkered with household appliances and fixed old cars and bicycles.

McGinnis attended Illinois Valley Community College to study mechanical engineering and then joined the US Army, serving in the Korean War and setting up weaponry. After leaving the Army, he took advantage of the G.I. Bill to fund his studies, gaining a Bachelor's of Science in mechanical engineering at the University of Illinois Urbana-Champaign in 1958. McGinnis then moved to Pittsburgh, Pennsylvania, to gain his master's degree in mechanical engineering at the University of Pittsburgh.

== Career ==
To afford his master's degree, McGinnis worked at Westinghouse Electric in a research position while completing his studies. He remained at Westinghouse for eleven years, eventually becoming the manager of the bioengineering department in 1963. McGinnis believed that the human body was like a machine which occasionally needed replacement parts. As manager, he took part in research involving artificial hearts and human survival in space. In 1969, McGinnis became head of the Surgical Research Department of Allegheny General Hospital, remaining in that position until 1971. There, he researched replacements for the endotracheal tube, as the tight seal it created risked damaging the windpipe.

After McGinnis left Allegheny General Hospital in 1971, he used his wife's US$7,000 inheritance and $50,000 from colleagues at hospital to found Lanz Medical Products in his house. McGinnis created ceramic anesthesia masks and tracheotomy tubes, using the kitchen oven as a kiln and the basement as a drying area. McGinnis worked through the night tinkering to avoid disturbing his family and slept during daytime hours. The company also produced cuffs for endotracheal tubes which regulated how tightly the tubes were sealed, reducing the risk of windpipe damage. While working at Lanz Medical Products, McGinnis also worked at Critical Care Department at the Presbyterian-University Hospital from 1971 to 1975, participating in programs which sought medical applications for technological devices. After five years of operation, McGinnis sold the company.

In 1976, McGinnis created Respironics. The company initially focused on the same products as Lanz Medical Products, namely endotracheal tubes and anesthesia masks. The company often struggled financially, frequently turning to loans from banks and private lenders. After Colin Sullivan published his 1981 article on CPAP machines, Mark Sanders, a Pittsburgh pulmonologist, advised McGinnis to develop a CPAP machine for residential use. In late 1984, Respironics received approval from Food and Drug Administration to sell their CPAP machine and the company released the SleepEasy the following year. The demand these products produced was so high that distributors artificially inflated the price to keep up with supply. When one Winnipeg physician complained about the price, McGinnis travelled to Winnipeg to meet the physician personally and demanded that the distributors lower the price. Respironics also found commercial success in creating an anesthesia mask that was durable and leak-proof. The company was able to keep the costs down by outsourcing the labor to Hong Kong, where Hong Kong businessmen were rewarded with half of the company's stock. Respironics employed about 700 people in Hong Kong and 290 in Murrysville, Pennsylvania. In 1987, a fire destroyed a company plant in Wilmerding.

As the company grew, McGinnis shifted his focus away from product development and toward business affairs. In 1990, he was elected to Point Park College board of directors. McGinnis was an outspoken Republican; he strongly opposed capital gains taxes and believed tax cuts would help aid economic growth.

== Later life and legacy ==
In the early 2000s, Philips bought many medical device companies and offered to buy Respironics for $66 a share when its stock was worth $53. McGinnis and the Respironics board did not want to sell the company and declined an earlier takeover offer. However, they reluctantly accepted the sale because the shareholders wanted to cash out. After Respironics was sold to Philips in 2008, McGinnis stepped down from his leadership role. When Respironics recalled its machines in 2021 due to a defect which caused noise-reducing foam to degrade and release toxic chemicals, McGinnis attributed the recall to a culture shift in the company following the Philips' takeover, calling it a "disappointment and embarrassment". The year before Philips bought the company, it was named by Forbes Magazine one of "America's Most Trustworthy Companies".

In his later years, McGinnis made many philanthropic donations to various institutions and received accolades for his work in sleep medicine. In 2006, Allegheny General Hospital opened the Gerald McGinnis Cardiovascular Institute after McGinnis made large contributions to help build it. He also sponsored an endowed chair of sleep medicine at Harvard Medical School.

On January 25, 2024, Gerald McGinnis died from complications of Parkinson's disease at age 89.

== Awards ==
- Distinguished Alumnus Award, Grainger College of Engineering
- Engineering at Illinois Hall of Fame, Grainger College of Engineering, 2010
- History Makers Award, Heinz History Center, 2011
- Lifetime Achievement Award, Pittsburgh Venture Capital Association, 2016
