= Frans van Houten =

Dutch businessman

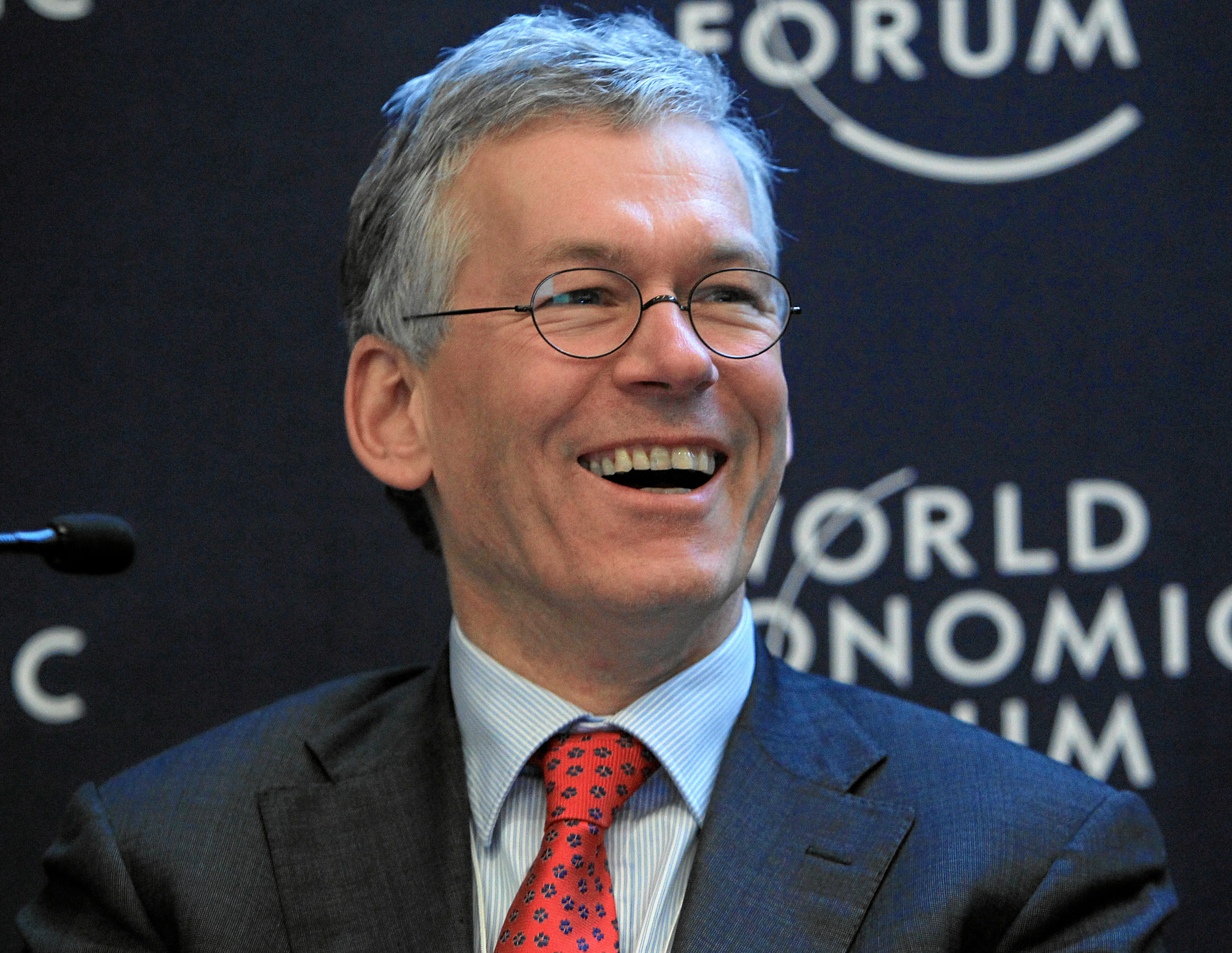
- Frans van Houten at the World Economic Forum Annual Meeting in 2013
- Born: François Adrianus van Houten; 26 April 1960 (age 65); Netherlands
- Occupation: CEO

François Adrianus "Frans" van Houten (born 26 April 1960) is a Dutch businessman. He was the CEO of Royal Philips Electronics (known as Philips) from April 2011 to October 2022.

== Biography ==
The son of a member of the board of directors of Philips, Frans van Houten studied Economics at Erasmus University Rotterdam, and started his career at Philips in 1986 in marketing and sales at Philips Data Systems. He held several positions in the company, becoming co-head of the consumer electronics division in 2002.

In November 2004, he became CEO of Philips Semiconductors, where he led the spin-off of the division, resulting in the formation of NXP Semiconductors on 1 October 2006. Van Houten left his position as Chief Executive Officer at NXP on 31 December 2008.

On 8 July 2010, van Houten was nominated to succeed Gerard Kleisterlee as CEO of Philips in order to focus more on healthcare.

Since then, he and his team has driven the transformation and revitalization of the Philips portfolio to become a focused health technology company through targeted divestment, acquisition and organic business development. Under his first five years at Philips, shares moved mostly sideways, underperforming the benchmark AEX index by about 10 percent. In 2016, he floated Philips Lighting, the company's original business dating back to 1891, allowing the parent to focus on healthcare equipment. His strategy is also exemplified by the sale of the television business in 2012; the audio and video businesses in 2014. At the same time, Philips has invested in a number of acquisitions that strengthen the company's portfolio, among them medical device leaders Volcano and Spectranetics, respiratory care leader RespirTech, and population health management leaders Wellcentive and VitalHealth, as well as others in digital pathology, neurology, pregnancy & parenting, healthcare informatics and ultrasound. He's also driven increased investment in R&D to establish new businesses in areas like digital pathology, medical wearables and healthcare informatics.

On 16 August 2022, Philips announced that they had parted ways with van Houten due to a mass product recall of Philips Respironics CPAP devices that halved the company's stocks and would further reduce it below the value it had prior to his appointment as CEO.

== Leadership Beyond Royal Philips ==
Frans was Co-Chair at the World Economic Forum in Davos in 2017. He was appointed a member of the Board of Directors of Novartis in February, 2017.

=== Sustainability and the Circular Economy ===
Van Houten was one of the initiators of the Compact for Responsive and Responsible Leadership, which aims to create a corporate governance framework with a focus on the long-term sustainability of corporations and the long-term goals of society. He is an avid supporter and advocate of sustainability and the implementation of a circular economy, and received the Fortune Award for Circular Economy Leadership at an event around the 2018 World Economic Forum Meeting in Davos.

He is one of the original leaders at the World Economic Forum on the circular economy, and co-chair of the Board of Directors and leading Royal Philip's overall engagement in Platform for Accelerating the Circular Economy (PACE). PACE is a public-private collaboration platform and project accelerator focused on building the circular economy. Philip's engagement in PACE includes membership in PACE's Capital Equipment Coalition and a project on e-waste in Nigeria.

=== Single European Market ===
A proponent of a united, single European market, Frans is also a member of the European Round Table of Industrialists, an advocacy organization comprising the 50 largest European multinationals. He is co-founder and advocate of NL2025, a platform of Dutch influencers who support initiatives to create a better future for the Netherlands in the areas of education, sustainable growth and a vital society.

== Other activities ==
=== Corporate boards ===
- Novartis, Member of the Board of Directors (since 2017)

=== Non-profit organizations ===
- European Round Table of Industrialists (ERT), Member
- NL2025, Co-Founder

== Recognition ==
In 2018, Philips was named in 19th position in Forbes magazine's ranking of the World's Most Reputable Companies; among the Top 25 Companies That Get Design Right by Fortune magazine and among the Top 100 Global Innovators for the fifth consecutive year by Clarivate Analytics (formerly Thomson Reuters Intellectual Property & Science business).

In addition, Van Houten was named among the Top 20 Global Business Leaders in 2017 by Fortune magazine. Its citation stated: “We lean toward CEOs with vision — those impacting the world beyond their companies. The 20 star executives are doing nothing less than defining the future of business.”
