= Non-invasive ventilation =

Breathing support administered through a face mask

- The setup for non-invasive ventilation using a mechanical ventilator. Modern devices are often much smaller.
- Other names: Non-invasive positive pressure ventilation (NIPPV), NIV, NPPV

Non-invasive ventilation (NIV) is the use of breathing support administered through a face mask, nasal mask, or a helmet. Air, usually with added oxygen, is delivered through the mask under positive pressure. The pressure generally alternates depending on whether the person is inhaling or exhaling. It is termed "non-invasive" because it is delivered with a mask that is tightly fitted to the face or around the head, but without a need for tracheal intubation (a tube through the mouth into the windpipe). While there are similarities with regard to the interface, NIV is not the same as continuous positive airway pressure (CPAP), which applies a single level of positive airway pressure throughout the whole respiratory cycle; CPAP does not deliver ventilation but is occasionally used in conditions also treated with NIV.

Non-invasive ventilation is used in acute respiratory failure caused by a number of medical conditions, most prominently chronic obstructive pulmonary disease (COPD); numerous studies have shown that appropriate use of NIV reduces the need for invasive ventilation and its complications. Furthermore, it may be used on a long-term basis in people who cannot breathe independently as a result of a chronic condition.

== Medical uses ==
NIV for acute respiratory failure is used particularly for severe exacerbations of chronic obstructive pulmonary disease (COPD) but also for acute decompensated heart failure and other acute conditions. NIV can be used acutely and long-term. Some people who present with acute respiratory failure require long-term use of NIV at home.

Non-invasive ventilation has been suggested in the treatment for coronavirus disease 2019 (COVID-19) where shortages of invasive ventilation equipment and facilities may arise. Poorly fitting masks may emit aerosols, requiring caregivers.

=== COPD ===
The most common indication for acute non-invasive ventilation is for acute exacerbation of chronic obstructive pulmonary disease. The decision to initiate NIV, usually in the emergency department, depends on the initial response to medication (bronchodilators given by nebulizer) and the results of arterial blood gas tests. If after medical therapy the lungs remain unable to clear carbon dioxide from the bloodstream (respiratory acidosis), NIV may be indicated. Many people with COPD have chronically elevated CO_{2} levels with metabolic compensation, but NIV is only indicated if the CO_{2} is acutely increased to the point that the acidity levels of the blood are increased (pH<7.35). There is no level of acidity above which NIV cannot be started, but more severe acidosis carries a higher risk that NIV alone is not effective and that mechanical ventilation will be required instead.

=== Other causes of AHRF ===
Bronchiectasis may lead to acute hypercapnic respiratory failure (AHRF), and NIV may be used similarly as for COPD. This is particularly the case where the underlying cause is cystic fibrosis. Cystic fibrosis also causes high volumes of sputum (phlegm) which may require specialised physiotherapy assistance and sometimes the insertion of a mini-tracheostomy to clear this.

In people with chest wall deformity or neuromuscular disease, NIV may be commenced if the CO_{2} level is elevated even if it has not yet caused acidosis. In neuromuscular disease, a breathing measurement known as the vital capacity is used to determine a need for breathing support.

Obesity hypoventilation syndrome (OHS) may cause acute hypercapnic respiratory failure. When this is the case, the criteria for commencing acute NIV are similar to those for COPD (decreased pH, elevated CO_{2}), although there are some scenarios where NIV may be initiated in hospitalized people despite a normal pH; these include people with daytime somnolence, sleep-disordered breathing and/or evidence of right ventricle heart failure.

In acute cardiogenic pulmonary oedema caused by decompensated heart failure, the quality of evidence is poor but studies have shown a reduced risk of death and a decreased need for tracheal intubation for both NIV and CPAP. Both CPAP and NIV may be used in the prehospital care setting.

Acute severe asthma may cause AHRF, when it is labelled "near-fatal asthma". There is limited evidence on whether NIV is effective in this situation, which carries a high risk of requiring mechanical ventilation. Professional guidelines therefore do not give a clear recommendation, and it is suggested that NIV is only used in an intensive care unit setting where further deterioration can be managed immediately, or not at all. Some people with chronic asthma develop fixed airways disease that resembles COPD, and NIV may be used in that setting.

Respiratory failure may develop after major surgery. NIV may be used in this setting during the recovery period. In those who have undergone mechanical ventilation on the intensive care unit and are considered at high risk of recurrence, NIV may be used to prevent this. However, if respiratory failure does develop, recommencement of mechanical ventilation is recommended over NIV to treat this. In those who were ventilated for hypercapnic respiratory failure, NIV may be used to facilitate the weaning process.

=== Chronic/home use ===
Chronic use of NIV ("home NIV") may be indicated for severe COPD. A review from 2021 demonstrated that the chronic use of non-invasive ventilation improves daytime hypercapnia. In addition, in stable chronic obstructive pulmonary disease, survival seems to be improved and there might be a short term benefit of health-related quality of life.

Home NIV may also be indicated in people with neuromuscular disease and chest wall deformity.

People with obesity hypoventilation syndrome often require NIV initially in their care, but many can be switched to CPAP. American Thoracic Society (ATS) clinical practice guidelines recommend that NIV is provided on discharge with a further sleep study assessment as an outpatient. With regards to initiation of positive pressure treatment, the ATS guidelines recommend that in people being investigated for possible obstructive sleep apnea (OSA, a related condition), measurement of arterial carbon dioxide (in high probability) or venous bicarbonate (in moderate probability) is performed to identify OHS and to determine an indication for treatment. In those with both severe OSA and OHS, initial treatment with CPAP is recommended although the quality of research supporting this over NIV is poor. In the 30% of people with OHS who do not also have severe OSA, NIV may be more effective but is also more cost- and resource-intensive. In those who have both OSA and OHS, poor response to CPAP despite good adherence may be an indication to switch to NIV.

People with motor neuron disease (MND) may require home NIV in the course of their illness. Guidelines in the United Kingdom stipulate that assessment of respiratory function is part of the multidisciplinary management of MND.

== Terminology ==
A number of terms have been used in the medical literature to describe NIV. The more formal name "non-invasive positive pressure ventilation" (NPPV or NIPPV) has been used to distinguish it from the use of the now very rare negative pressure ventilator ("iron lung"). The brand name BiPAP/BIPAP (for Bilevel Positive Airway Pressure) has also enjoyed a degree of popularity, after an early NIV machine produced by Respironics, but its use is now discouraged.

== History ==
Non-invasive ventilation has been used since 1940s for various indications, but its present-day use for chronic breathing problems arose in the 1980s for people with chronic respiratory muscle weakness, and in the 1990s on intensive care units and other acute care settings for acute respiratory failure. The development of non-invasive ventilation in acute care settings was further advanced by clinical investigations in the late 1980s and early 1990s. Early studies demonstrated that positive pressure ventilation delivered via face mask could improve gas exchange, reduce the work of breathing, and decrease the need for endotracheal intubation in selected patients with acute respiratory failure. Subsequent randomized controlled trials in the 1990s further established its efficacy across diverse patient populations and contributed to its adoption in intensive care practice. These findings helped define early clinical protocols and informed the integration of non-invasive ventilation into routine intensive care practice.

Since 2000, acute NIV has been used widely in the treatment of acute respiratory failure, particularly in people with COPD, including on general wards rather than the intensive care unit setting. In the United Kingdom, a 2017 report by NCEPOD found that there were widespread problems in the delivery of high-quality care to patients.
