= National Confidential Enquiry into Patient Outcome and Death =

Charity based in London, England

The National Confidential Enquiry into Perioperative Death (NCEPOD) is a registered charity based in London, with Marisa Mason as the Chief Executive and Suzy Lishman as the Chair of the Trustees. The organisation started from a pilot study of mortality associated with anaesthesia for five regions in England, Wales and Scotland published in 1982. A joint venture was established between surgery and anaesthesia, named the Confidential Enquiry into Perioperative Deaths. It became the National Confidential Enquiry into Perioperative Deaths (NCEPOD) in 1988 and published its first report in 1990. It now covers all specialities and covers all outcomes as well as deaths.

It is a condition of registration with the General Medical Council as a doctor, that registered medical practitioners in the UK must participate in the work of confidential enquiries. All NHS Trusts in England are required to participate in NCEPOD studies as part of Quality Accounts. The Department of Health and the Scottish Government require NHS Trusts and health boards to participate. It is commissioned by the Healthcare Quality Improvement Partnership on behalf of NHS England, Northern Ireland, Scotland, Wales and the Channel Islands to undertake the Medical & Surgical Clinical Outcome Review Programme.

== Published reports ==
NCEPOD's 2015 report on gastrointestinal bleed services demonstrated major deficiencies in the diagnosis and subsequent treatment of the condition, and called for 24-hour access to specialists.

Its report "Mental Health in General Hospitals: Treat as One" was published on 26 January 2017. The report identified factors affecting the quality of care of patients aged 18 years or older with a significant mental disorder who are admitted to a general hospital.

In July 2017 it published a study which found that many patients who needed non-invasive ventilation (NIV) for acute respiratory failure had problems in the quality of their care. There was a high mortality rate - over a third of patients treated with NIV. The British Thoracic Society supported the recommendation for NIV to be administered in a dedicated clinical area in every hospital. Lack of ventilators in hospitals was a common problem, even though a basic machine costs less than £2,000.

Each and Every Need, published in March 2018, looked at the care provided to children, young people and young adults with cerebral palsy and included national data analysis provided by Cardiff University.

Since then, NCEPOD has published numerous reports such as Acute Heart Failure: Failure to Function (2018), Cancer in Children, Teens and Young Adults: On the Right Course? (2018), Perioperative Diabetes: High and Lows (2018), Mental Healthcare in Young People and Young Adults (2019), Pulmonary Embolism: Know the Score (2019), Acute Bowel Obstruction: Delay in Transit (2020), Long Term Ventilation: Balancing the Pressures (2020), In Hospital Care of Out-of-Hospital Cardiac Arrests: Time Matters (2021) and Dysphagia in Parkinson’s Disease (2021).

Their latest report to be published is How data captured by NCEPOD supports the identification of healthcare inequalities - A Review, published in early 2022.
