= Continuous positive airway pressure =

Ventilator which applies mild air pressure continuously to keep airways open

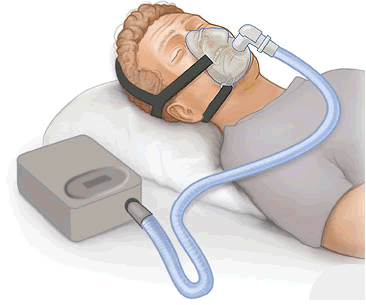
- Equipment for CPAP therapy: flow generator, hose, mask
- Pronunciation: /ˈsiːpæp/ SEE-pap
- Uses: Treatment of obstructive sleep apnea, acute decompensated heart failure, and COVID-19

Continuous positive airway pressure (CPAP) is a form of positive airway pressure (PAP) ventilation in which a flow of air with pressure greater than atmospheric pressure is continuously applied to the upper respiratory tract of a person. This flow is generated by a device to which a flexible hose is connected that in turn feeds air into a mask. The application of positive relative pressure may be intended to prevent upper airway collapse, as occurs in obstructive sleep apnea (OSA), or to reduce the work of breathing in conditions such as acute decompensated heart failure. CPAP therapy is highly effective for managing obstructive sleep apnea. Compliance and acceptance of use of CPAP therapy can be a limiting factor, with 8% of people stopping use after the first night and 50% within the first year. For treatment of chronic conditions such as obstructive sleep apnea, CPAP needs to be used for all sleep, including naps and travel away from home.

== Medical uses ==
=== Moderate to severe obstructive sleep apnea ===
CPAP is the most effective treatment for moderate to severe obstructive sleep apnea, in which the mild pressure from the CPAP prevents the airway from collapsing or becoming blocked. CPAP has been shown to be highly effective at eliminating obstructive sleep apneas in the majority of people who use the therapy according to the recommendations of their physician. There is weak evidence that CPAP therapy may reduce erectile dysfunction symptoms in people with obstructive sleep apnea.

Use of CPAP for people with sleep apnea reduces the overall risk of death from cardiovascular causes.

=== Upper airway resistance syndrome ===
Upper airway resistance syndrome (UARS) is another form of sleep-disordered breathing with symptoms that are similar to obstructive sleep apnea, but is instead marked by increased airway resistance and frequent sleep disruptions without the complete airway collapse or significant oxygen desaturation characteristic of OSA. CPAP can be used to treat UARS as the condition progresses, in order to prevent it from developing into obstructive sleep apnea.

=== Pre-term infants ===
CPAP also may be used to treat pre-term infants whose lungs are not yet fully developed. For example, physicians may use CPAP in infants with respiratory distress syndrome. It is associated with a decrease in the incidence of bronchopulmonary dysplasia. In some preterm infants whose lungs have not fully developed, CPAP improves survival and decreases the need for steroid treatment for their lungs. In resource-limited settings where CPAP improves respiratory rate and survival in children with primary pulmonary disease, researchers have found that nurses can initiate and manage care with once- or twice-daily physician rounds.

=== Asthma ===
CPAP can be used for the treatment of obstructive pulmonary diseases including asthma.

=== COVID-19 ===
In March 2020, the USFDA suggested that CPAP devices may be used to support patients affected by COVID-19; however, they recommended additional filtration since non-invasive ventilation may increase the risk of infectious transmission.

CPAP setup for adults with COVID 19 in low resource settings

=== Other uses ===
CPAP also has been suggested for treating acute hypoxaemic respiratory failure in children. However, due to a limited number of clinical studies, the effectiveness and safety of this approach to providing respiratory support is not clear.

== Contraindications ==
CPAP cannot be used in the following situations or conditions:

- A person is not breathing on their own
- A person is uncooperative or anxious
- A person cannot protect their own airway (i.e., has altered consciousness for reasons other than sleep, such as extreme illness, intoxication, coma, etc.)
- A person is not stable due to respiratory arrest
- A person has experienced facial trauma or facial burns
- A person who has had previous facial, esophageal, or gastric surgery may find this a difficult or unsuitable treatment option, or may need to fully heal from surgery before using this treatment

== Adverse effects ==
Some people experience difficulty adjusting to CPAP therapy and report general discomfort, nasal congestion, abdominal bloating (including increased flatulence), sensations of claustrophobia, mask leak problems, and convenience-related complaints. Oral leak problems, in which air from the machine is expelled back out of the mouth instead of holding the respiratory tract open, also interfere with CPAP effectiveness.

== Mechanism ==
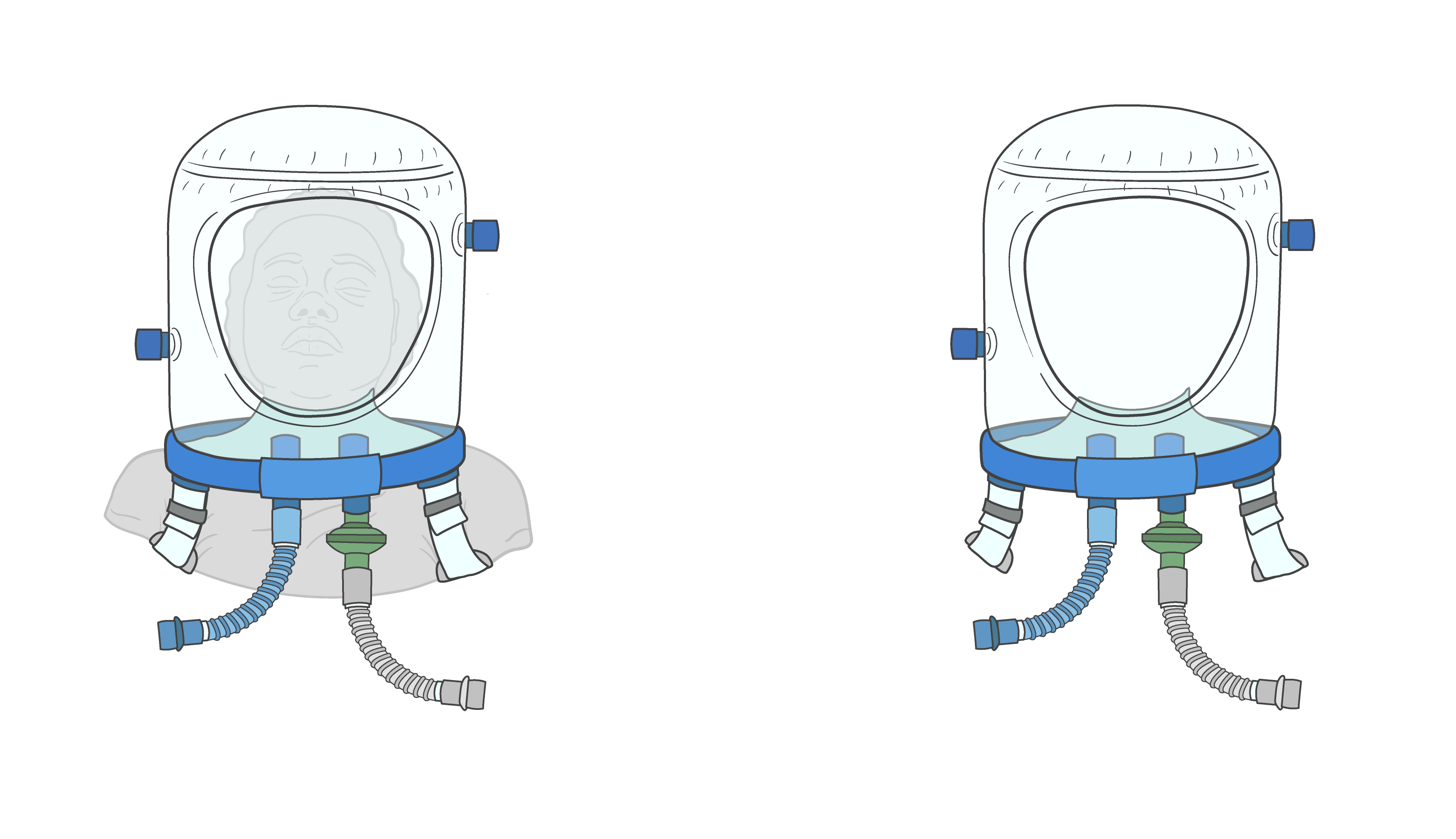
Helmet used as a CPAP oxygen delivery interface

CPAP therapy uses machines specifically designed to deliver a flow of air at a constant pressure. CPAP machines possess a motor that pressurizes room temperature air and delivers it through a hose connected to a mask or tube worn by the patient. This constant stream of air opens and keeps the upper airway unobstructed during inhalation and exhalation. For the same reason, CPAP has been shown to ease snoring, even in subjects without sleep apnea Some CPAP machines have other features as well, such as heated humidifiers, and connectivity to allow data from during sleep to be viewed with a smartphone app.

The therapy is an alternative to positive end-expiratory pressure (PEEP). Both modalities stent open the alveoli in the lungs and thus recruit more of the lung surface area for ventilation. However, while PEEP refers to devices that impose positive pressure only at the end of the exhalation, CPAP devices apply continuous positive airway pressure throughout the breathing cycle. Thus, the ventilator does not cycle during CPAP, no additional pressure greater than the level of CPAP is provided, and patients must initiate their breaths.

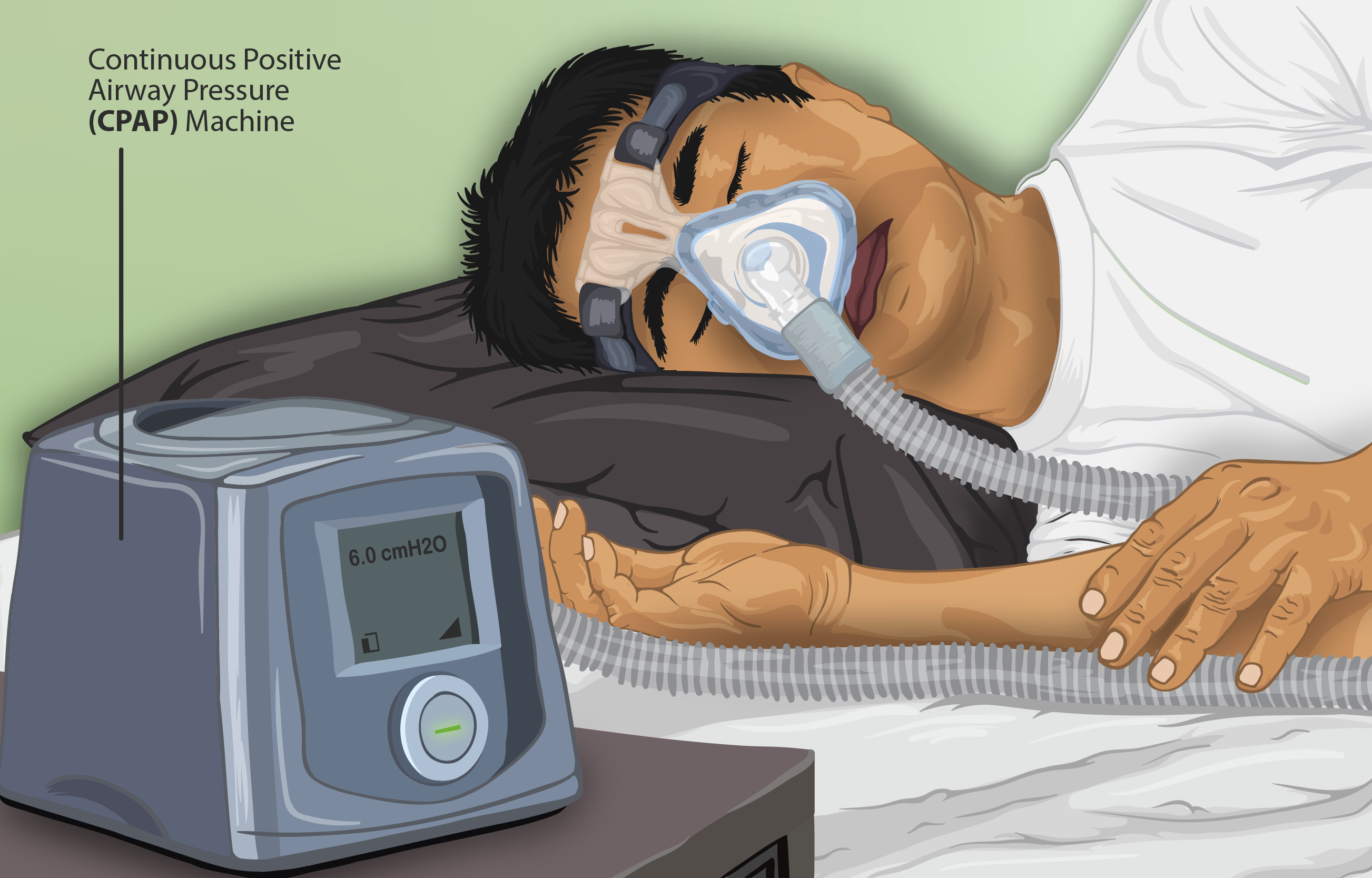
An example of a nasal mask for CPAP

=== Method of delivery of CPAP ===
==== Nasal CPAP ====
Nasal prongs (commonly referred to as nasal pillows) or a nasal mask is the most common modality of treatment. Nasal prongs are placed directly in the person's nostrils. A nasal mask is a small mask that covers the nose. There are also nasal pillow masks which have a cushion at the base of the nostrils, and are considered the least invasive option. Frequently, nasal CPAP is used for infants, although this use is controversial. Studies have shown nasal CPAP reduces ventilator time, but an increased occurrence of pneumothorax also was prevalent.

==== Nasopharyngeal CPAP ====
Nasopharyngeal CPAP is administered by a tube that is placed through the person's nose and ends in the nasopharynx. This tube bypasses the nasal cavity in order to deliver the CPAP farther down in the upper respiratory system.

==== Face mask ====
A full face mask over the mouth and nose is another approach for people who breathe out of their mouths when they sleep, as this can deal with oral air leaks that reduce effectiveness of CPAP. Often, oral masks and naso-oral masks are used when nasal congestion or obstruction is an issue. There are also devices that combine nasal pressure with mandibular advancement devices (MAD).

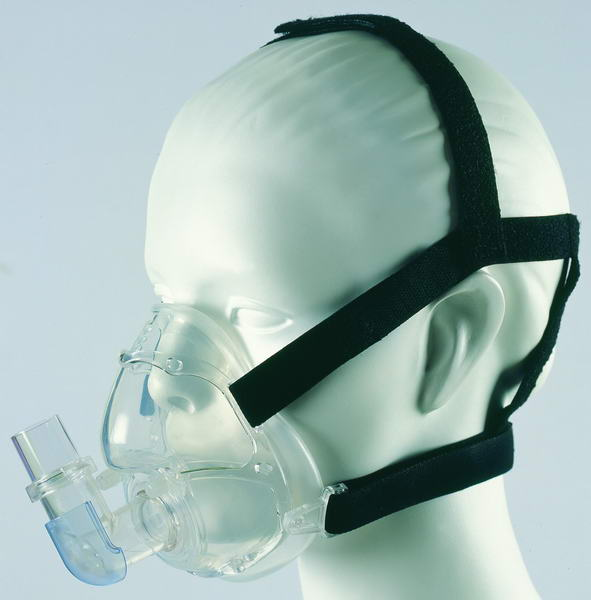
Example of a full face mask CPAP

The use of specialized surgical tape appropriate for placement over the mouth with lips closed, or a flexible cloth chin strap to hold the jaws together, are other options to prevent air leaks while sleeping.

Hybrid

Another type of full face mask is the hybrid face mask. This mask include a mouth portion to reduce leaks with air escaping out of the mouth but incorporates an under the nose nasal cushion as well to promote nasal breathing.

== Compliance ==
A large portion of people do not adhere to the recommended method of CPAP therapy, with more than 50% of people discontinuing use in the first year. A significant change in behavior is required in order to commit to long-term use of CPAP therapy and this can be difficult for many people, since CPAP equipment should be used consistently for all sleep (including naps and overnight trips away from home) and needs to be regularly maintained and replaced over time. Proper calibration of CPAP machine settings, such as flow pressure and other automatic adjustments carried out by the machine during sleep, can take significant amounts of trial and error as well as ongoing consultations with sleep specialists and equipment providers.

In addition, people with moderate to severe obstructive sleep apnea have a higher risk of concomitant symptoms such as anxiety and depression, which can make it more difficult to change their sleep habits and to use CPAP on a regular basis. Educational and supportive approaches have been shown to help motivate people who need CPAP therapy to use their devices more often.

== History ==
CPAP was developed by Dr. George Gregory and colleagues in the neonatal intensive care unit at the University of California, San Francisco. Dr. Colin Sullivan, an Australian physician and professor, invented a machine in 1980 applying CPAP for use on adult patients with sleep apnea at Royal Prince Alfred Hospital in Sydney. Gerald McGinnis, founder of Respironics, began selling one of the first commercially available CPAP machines for adults with sleep apnea in 1985.

== See also ==
- Positive end-expiratory pressure – Pressure in the lungs above atmospheric pressure
