= Practitioner Performance Advice =

Practitioner Performance Advice, formerly the National Clinical Assessment Service (NCAS), is an organisation that works towards the resolution of concerns about professional practice in healthcare settings across the United Kingdom. By providing their expertise to assist healthcare organisations and individuals resolve concerns, the work of this organisation contributes to improved patient safety.

It currently has 70 staff, now operating as a division of NHS Resolution.

It can receive up to 1,000 new referrals each year. At any one time it can be dealing with more than 500 active cases, which the service can often manage from referral to resolution.

== History ==
The National Clinical Assessment Authority was established on 1 April 2001 as a special health authority. It initially operated as a service within England for NHS doctors, although this has been extended by various agreements. It was renamed National Clinical Assessment Service when it merged with the National Patient Safety Agency in 2005. It transferred out of the agency into the National Institute for Health and Clinical Excellence, where it was hosted for a period of one year from 1 April 2012. It joined the NHS Litigation Authority on 1 April 2013.

== Working with regulatory bodies ==
It works with various regulatory bodies. In December 2011 the General Dental Council announced that it would be using it to obtain advice at an earlier stage when complaints were made about dental professionals. It has an agreement with the General Medical Council which has been in effect since May 2013.
