= Colin Sullivan (physician) =

Australian physician, professor and inventor

Colin Sullivan AO FAA is an Australian physician, professor, and inventor known for his invention of the nasal continuous positive airway pressure (CPAP) machine for the treatment of sleep apnea.

Sullivan began studying sleep apnea in the late 1970s. In 1981 he published a design for the first CPAP machine in The Lancet. He helped make CPAP machines and masks by hand in a workshop at the Royal Prince Alfred Hospital for the treatment of patients at the world's first sleep apnea clinic at the university. Over 100 patients were being treated there by 1985, and over 1000 patients by 1989.

Sullivan’s development of the nasal CPAP was a product of his long-term interest in the upper respiratory airway and its role in SIDS. Prior to the invention of the nasal CPAP machine sleep apnea was often treated with radical measures such as tracheotomy.

Sullivan was elected a Fellow of the Australian Academy of Science in 1997. In 2009 Prof. Sullivan was awarded an Officer of the Order of Australia Award for "service to medicine as an innovator in the field of sleep disorders and the development of equipment and treatment practices".
