= Oropharyngeal dysphagia =

Difficulty controlling the mouth or throat for swallowing

- Other names: Transfer dysphagia
- The digestive tract, with the esophagus marked in red
- Specialty: Gastroenterology, ENT surgery
- Symptoms: Hesitation or inability to initiate swallowing, food sticking in the throat, nasal regurgitation, difficulty swallowing solids, frequent repetitive swallows. frequent throat clearing, hoarse voice, cough, weight loss, and recurrent pneumonia.
- Complications: Aspiration, chest infection, malnutrition, dehydration, and death.
- Causes: Stroke, head trauma, neurodegenerative diseases, muscular or neuromuscular disorders, and local or structural lesions.
- Diagnostic method: Clinical swallow assessment, videofluoroscopy, fibreoptic endoscopic evaluation of swallowing, High-resolution manometry, Functional Lumen Imaging Probe, and accelerometry.
- Differential diagnosis: Esophageal dysphagia and Globus sensation.
- Treatment: Dietary modification, manipulation of swallowing posture, or swallowing technique, thickening agents, enteral tube feeding, surgical management, and botulinum toxin injection,
- Frequency: 6–50%

Oropharyngeal dysphagia is the inability to empty material from the oropharynx into the esophagus as a result of malfunction near the esophagus. Oropharyngeal dysphagia manifests differently depending on the underlying pathology and the nature of the symptoms. Patients with dysphagia can experience feelings of food sticking to their throats, coughing and choking, weight loss, recurring chest infections, or regurgitation. Depending on the underlying cause, age, and environment, dysphagia prevalence varies. In research including the general population, the estimated frequency of oropharyngeal dysphagia has ranged from 2 to 16 percent.

== Signs and symptoms ==
Some signs and symptoms of swallowing difficulties include difficulty controlling food in the mouth, inability to control food or saliva in the mouth, difficulty initiating a swallow, coughing, choking, frequent pneumonia, unexplained weight loss, gurgly or wet voice after swallowing, nasal regurgitation, and dysphagia (patient complaint of swallowing difficulty). Other symptoms include drooling, dysarthria, dysphonia, aspiration pneumonia, depression, or nasopharyngeal regurgitation as associated symptoms. When asked where the food is getting stuck patients will often point to the cervical (neck) region as the site of the obstruction.

=== Complications ===
If left untreated, swallowing disorders can potentially cause aspiration pneumonia, malnutrition, or dehydration.

== Diagnosis ==
Oropharyngeal dysphagia is going to be suspected if the patient answers yes to one of the following questions: Do you cough or choke when trying to eat? After you swallow, does the food ever come back out through your nose?

A patient will most likely receive a Modified Barium swallow (MBS). Different consistencies of liquid and food mixed with barium sulfate are fed to the patient by spoon, cup or syringe, and x-rayed using videofluoroscopy. A patient's swallowing then can be evaluated and described. Some clinicians might choose to describe each phase of the swallow in detail, making mention of any delays or deviations from the norm. Others might choose to use a rating scale such as the Penetration Aspiration Scale. The scale was developed to describe the disordered physiology of a person's swallow using the numbers 1–8. Other scales also exist for this purpose.

A patient can also be assessed using videoendoscopy, also known as flexible fiberoptic endoscopic examination of swallowing (FFEES). The instrument is placed into the nose until the clinician can view the pharynx and then he or she examines the pharynx and larynx before and after swallowing. During the actual swallow, the camera is blocked from viewing the anatomical structures. A rigid scope, placed into the oral cavity to view the structures of the pharynx and larynx, can also be used, though this prevents the patient from swallowing.

Other less frequently used assessments of swallowing are imaging studies, ultrasound and scintigraphy and nonimaging studies, electromyography (EMG), electroglottography (EGG)(records vocal fold movement), cervical auscultation, and pharyngeal manometry.

=== Differential diagnosis ===
- A stroke can cause pharyngeal dysfunction with a high occurrence of aspiration. The function of normal swallowing may or may not return completely following an acute phase lasting approximately 6 weeks.
- Parkinson's disease can cause "multiple prepharyngeal, pharyngeal, and esophageal abnormalities". The severity of the disease most often correlates with the severity of the swallowing disorder.
- Neurologic disorders such as stroke, Parkinson's disease, amyotrophic lateral sclerosis, Bell's palsy, or myasthenia gravis can cause weakness of facial and lip muscles that are involved in coordinated mastication as well as weakness of other important muscles of mastication and swallowing.
- Oculopharyngeal muscular dystrophy is a genetic disease with palpebral ptosis, oropharyngeal dysphagia, and proximal limb weakness.
- Decrease in salivary flow, which can lead to dry mouth or xerostomia, can be due to Sjögren syndrome, anticholinergics, antihistamines, or certain antihypertensives and can lead to incomplete processing of food bolus.
- Xerostomia can reduce the volume and increase the viscosity of oral secretions making bolus formation difficult as well as reducing the ability to initiate and swallow the bolus
- Dental problems can lead to inadequate chewing.
- Abnormality in oral mucosa such as from mucositis, aphthous ulcers, or herpetic lesions can interfere with bolus processing.
- Mechanical obstruction in the oropharynx may be due to malignancies, cervical rings or webs, crico-phyringeus muscle dysfunction, or cervical osteophytes.
- Increased upper esophageal sphincter tone can be due to Parkinson's disease which leads to incomplete opening of the UES. This may lead to formation of a Zenker's diverticulum.
- Pharyngeal pouches typically cause difficulty in swallowing after the first mouthful of food, with regurgitation of the pouch contents. These pouches may be accompanied by malodorous breath due to decomposing foods residing in the pouches. (See Zenker's diverticulum)
- Dysphagia is often a side effect of surgical procedures like anterior cervical spine surgery, carotid endarterectomy, head and neck resection, oral surgeries like removal of the tongue, and partial laryngectomies
- Radiotherapy, used to treat head and neck cancer, can cause tissue fibrosis in the irradiated areas. Fibrosis of tongue and larynx lead to reduced tongue base retraction and laryngeal elevation during swallowing
- Infection may cause pharyngitis which can prevent swallowing due to pain.
- Medications can cause central nervous system effects that can result in swallowing disorders and oropharyngeal dysphagia. Examples: sedatives, hypnotic agents, anticonvulsants, antihistamines, neuroleptics, barbiturates, and antiseizure medication. Medications can also cause peripheral nervous system effects resulting in an oropharyngeal dysphagia. Examples: corticosteroids, L-tryptophan, and anticholinergics

== Treatment ==
Thickening agents

Food thickeners can be used to improve swallowing in pediatric populations.

Postural techniques.

- Head back (extension) – used when movement of the bolus from the front of the mouth to the back is inefficient; this allows gravity to help move the food.
- Chin down (flexion) – used when there is a delay in initiating the swallow; this allows the valleculae to widen, the airway to narrow, and the epiglottis to be pushed towards the back of the throat to better protect the airway from food.
- Chin down (flexion) – used when the back of the tongue is too weak to push the food towards the pharynx; this causes the back of the tongue to be closer to the pharyngeal wall.
- Head rotation (turning head to look over shoulder) to damaged or weaker side with chin down – used when the airway is not protected adequately causing food to be aspirated; this causes the epiglottis to be put in a more protective position, it narrows the entrance of the airway, and it increases vocal fold closure.
- Lying down on one side – used when there is reduced contraction of the pharynx causing excess residue in the pharynx; this eliminates the pull of gravity that may cause the residue to be aspirated when the patient resumes breathing.
- Head rotation to damaged or weaker side – used when there is paralysis or paresis on one side of the pharyngeal wall; this causes the bolus to go down the stronger side.
- Head tilt (ear to shoulder) to stronger side – used when there is weakness on one side of the oral cavity and pharyngeal wall; this causes the bolus to go down the stronger side.

Swallowing maneuvers.

- Supraglottic swallow — The patient is asked to take a deep breath and hold their breath. While still holding their breath they are to swallow and then immediately cough after swallowing. This technique can be used when there is reduced or late vocal fold closure or there is a delayed pharyngeal swallow.
- Super-supraglottic swallow — The patient is asked to take a breath, hold their breath tightly while bearing down, swallow while still holding the breath hold, and then coughing immediately after the swallow. This technique can be used when there is reduced closure of the airway.
- Effortful swallow — The patient is instructed to squeeze their muscles tightly while swallowing. This may be used when there is reduced posterior movement of the tongue base.
- Mendelsohn maneuver — The patient is taught how to hold their adam's apple up during a swallow. This technique may be used when there is reduced laryngeal movement or a discoordinated swallow.

Medical device

To strengthen muscles in the mouth and throat areas, researchers at the University of Wisconsin–Madison, led by Dr. JoAnne Robbins, developed a device in which patients perform isometric exercises with the tongue.

Diet modifications

Diet modification may be warranted. Some patients require a soft diet that is easily chewed, and some require liquids of a thinned or thickened consistency. The effectiveness of modifying food and fluid in preventing aspiration pneumonia has been questioned and these can be associated with poorer nutrition, hydration and quality of life. There has been considerable variability in national approaches to describing different degrees of thickened fluids and food textures. However, the International Dysphagia Diet Standardisation Initiative (IDDSI) group produced an agreed IDDSI framework consisting of a continuum of 8 levels (0-7), where drinks are measured from Levels 0 – 4, while foods are measured from Levels 3 – 7.

Environmental modifications

Environmental modification can be suggested to assist and reduce risk factors for aspiration. For example, removing distractions like too many people in the room or turning off the TV during feeding, etc.

Oral sensory awareness techniques

Oral sensory awareness techniques can be used with patients who have a swallow apraxia, tactile agnosia for food, delayed onset of the oral swallow, reduced oral sensation, or delayed onset of the pharyngeal swallow.

- pressure of a spoon against tongue
- using a sour bolus
- using a cold bolus
- using a bolus that requires chewing
- using a bolus larger than 3mL
- thermal-tactile stimulation (controversial)

Prosthetics

- Palatal lift or Palatal obturator
- Maxillary denture

=== Surgery ===
These are usually only recommended as a last resort.

- Tracheotomy
- Tracheostomy
- Vocal fold augmentation/injection
- Thryoplasty medialization
- Arytenoid adduction
- Partial or total laryngectomy
- Laryngotracheal separation
- Supralaryngectomy
- Palatoplasty
- Cricopharyngeal myotomy
- Zenker's diverticulectomy
- Percutaneous endoscopic gastrostomy
- Feeding tube
