= Palatal lift prosthesis =

Orthodontic prosthesis

A palatal lift prosthesis is a prosthesis that addresses a condition referred to as palatopharyngeal incompetence. Palatopharyngeal incompetence broadly refers to a muscular inability to sufficiently close the port between the nasopharynx and oropharynx during speech and/or swallowing. An inability to adequately close the palatopharyngeal port during speech results in hypernasalance that, depending upon its severity, can render speakers difficult to understand or unintelligible. The potential for compromised intelligibility secondary to hypernasalance is underscored when consideration is given to the fact that only three English language phonemes – /m/, /n/, and /ng/ – are pronounced with an open palatopharyngeal port. Furthermore, an impaired ability to effect a closure of the palatopharyngeal port while swallowing can result in the nasopharyngeal regurgitation of liquid or solid boluses.

Palatopharyngeal incompetence should not be confused with palatopharyngeal insufficiency. While palatopharyngeal incompetence and palatopharyngeal insufficiency contribute to similar symptomatology as they relate to speech and swallowing, the former results from a hypomobility or paralysis of intact anatomy that is normally responsible for effecting palatopharyngeal closure while the latter results from a congenital or acquired absence of that anatomy. Palatal lift prostheses are designed to address palatopharyngeal incompetence. Although structurally similar to palatal lift prostheses, technically distinct soft palatal obturator prostheses or speech aid prostheses are used to address palatopharyngeal insufficiency.

A palatal lift prosthesis addresses palatopharyngeal incompetence by physically displacing the dysfunctional soft palate in the hope of closing the palatopharyngeal port enough to mitigate hypernasal speech and/or prevent nasopharyngeal regurgitation of liquids or solids during the pharyngeal phase of swallowing. A palatal lift prosthesis consists of an oral component that stabilizes and secures the prosthesis and an oropharyngeal extension that superiorly and posteriorly displaces the impaired soft palate. Palatal lift prostheses are classified as interim or definitive prostheses.

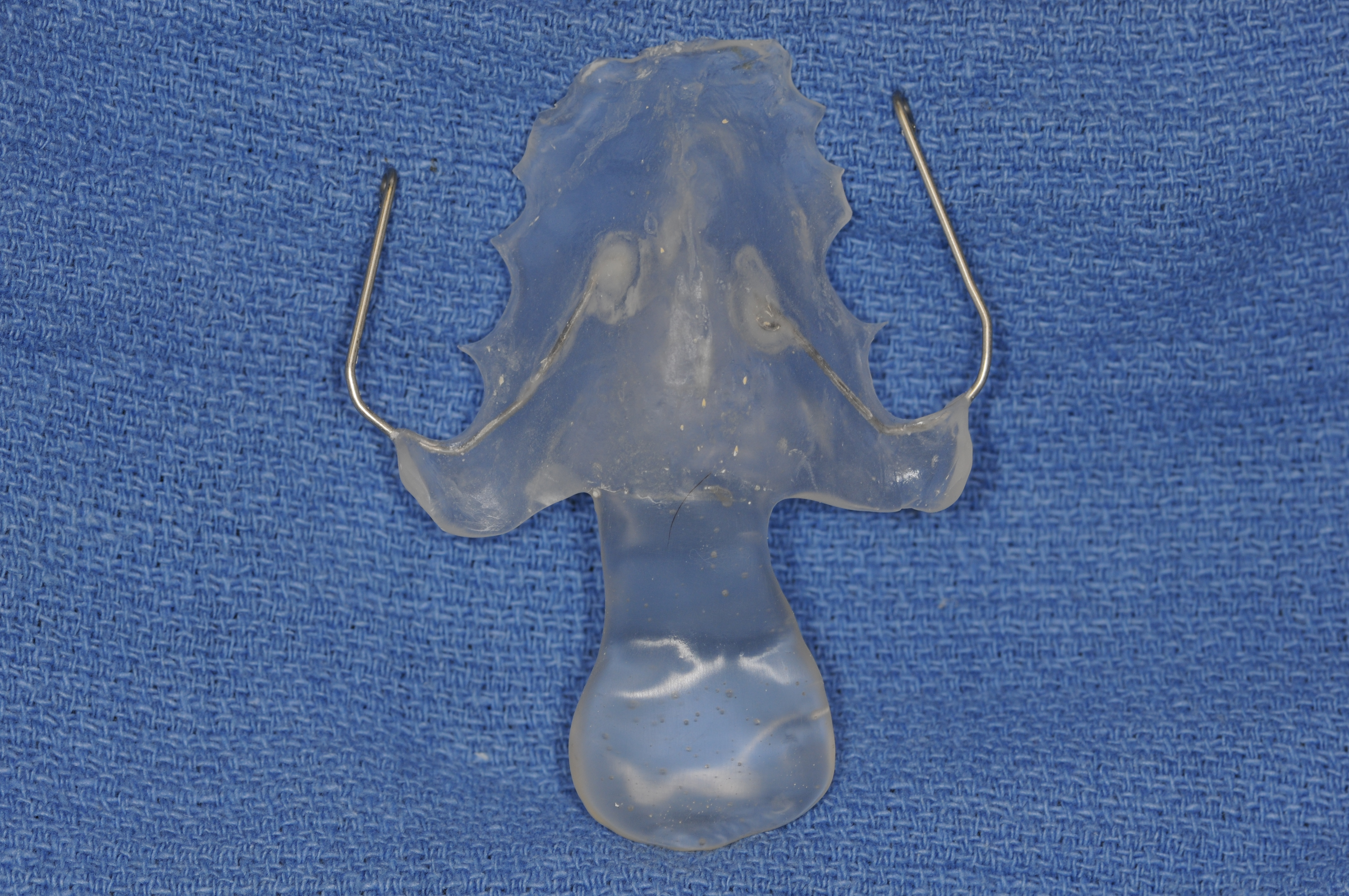
Interim palatal lift prosthesis consisting of polymethylmethacrylate and orthodontic wire clasps

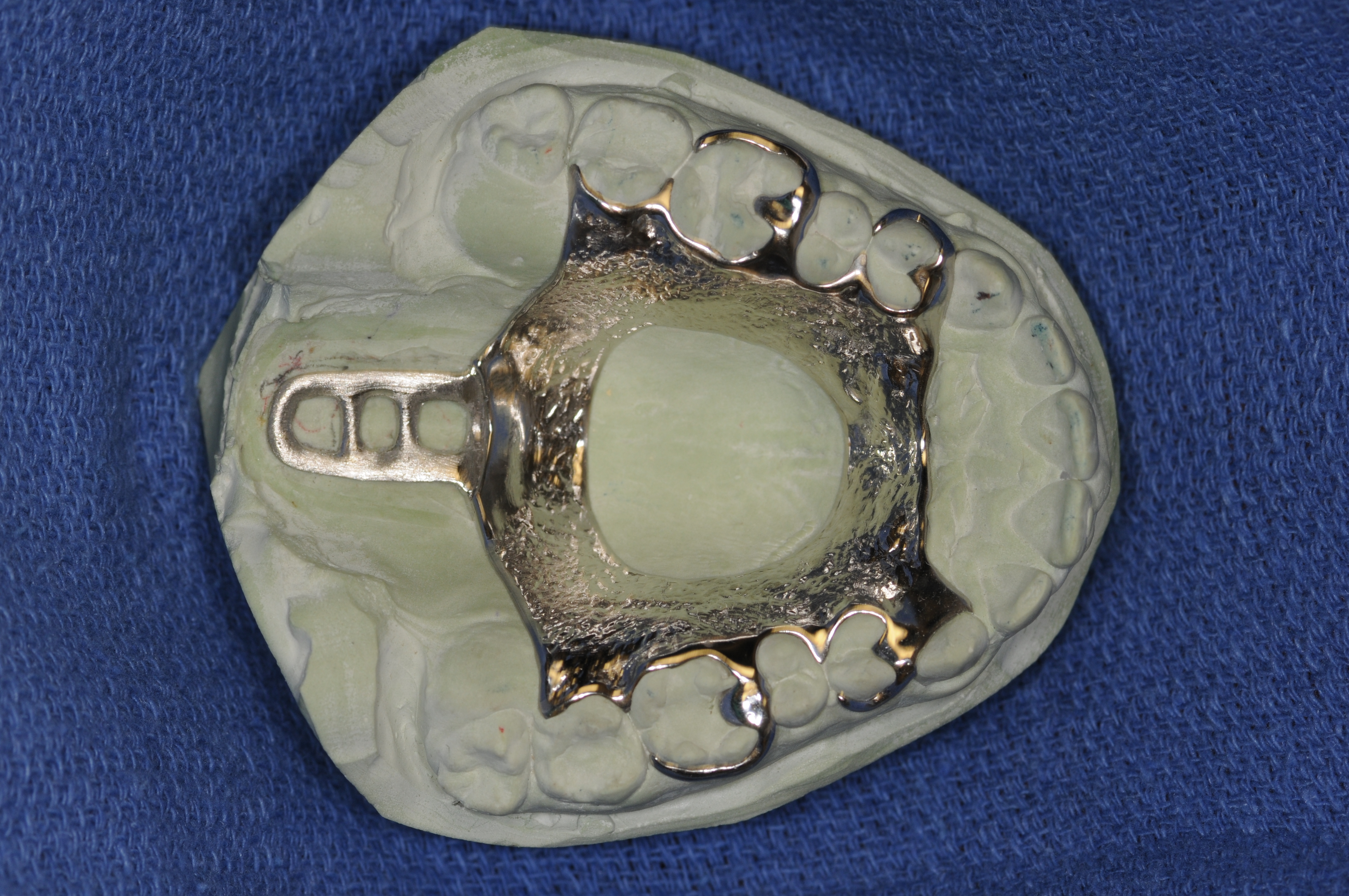
Cast metallic palatal lift prosthesis framework and the master cast upon which it was constructed prior to the addition of the polymethylmethacrylate responsible for elevating the soft palate.

Cast metallic palatal lift prosthesis following the addition of the polymethylmethacrylate responsible for elevating the soft palate.

An interim palatal lift prosthesis generally consists of two or more stainless steel wire retentive clasps embedded in polymethylmethacrylate that adapts to the hard palatal and soft palatal mucosal surfaces and the lingual aspects of the maxillary teeth. An interim palatal lift prosthesis carries a current dental terminology code number of D5958. A definitive palatal lift prosthesis generally consists of a thin cast metallic alloy lamina that covers the hard palatal mucosa and the lingual aspects of the maxillary teeth and incorporates retentive clasps that strategically engage undercut dental surfaces to enhance the retentive capacity of the prosthesis. The cast metallic portion of a definitive palatal lift prosthesis typically harbors a posterior cast metal lattice that retains a polymethylmethacrylate oropharyngeal section of the prosthesis responsible for elevating the soft palate. A definitive palatal lift prosthesis carries a current dental terminology code number of D5955. Definitive and interim palatal lift prostheses both carry current procedural terminology code numbers of 21083.

== Palatal Lift Prosthesis Retention ==
Because a mechanically displaced soft palate imparts enough force upon a palatal lift prosthesis to dislodge it, dentoalveolar anatomy must be considered prior to the fabrication of a palatal lift prosthesis. Although no algorithm regarding a requisite number of teeth exists for the retention of a palatal lift prosthesis, the possession of a full complement of healthy maxillary teeth offers more assurance of adequate retention than any other factor. While palatal lift prostheses can be retained by patients exhibiting maxillary partial edentulism, partially edentulous patients without posterior maxillary teeth suitable for the receipt of prosthetic clasps also known as direct retainers enjoy less retentive predictability than patients with maxillary posterior teeth. Similarly, partially edentulous patients missing anterior maxillary teeth lack the stability and retention afforded by anterior portions of the palatal lift prosthesis called indirect retainers that appose the lingual aspects of anterior maxillary teeth. Alternatively, patients missing enough teeth to compromise the predictable retention of a palatal lift prosthesis may become candidates for the fabrication of a palatal lift prosthesis with the placement of endosseous titanium implants and abutments designed to serve as retentive elements in partially edentulous and edentulous patients.

Interim Palatal Lift Prostheses Retentive Clasp Assembly

Retentive clasp assemblies responsible for securing interim palatal lift prostheses often benefit from the development of exaggerated retentive undercuts. Such undercuts can be bilaterally added to the most posterior dental abutments by bonding a bulk of composite resin to the buccal surface of the proposed retainers if they are adult teeth and the surfaces to which the composite resin is to be added are not restored with metallic or ceramic restorative material. When providing supplemental retentive undercuts for interim palatal lift prostheses to be retained by primary teeth or teeth whose buccal surfaces have been replaced by metallic or ceramic restorative material, the placement of orthodontic bands that harbor large buccal orthodontic brackets can serve as an alternative to the placement of composite resin.

Interim palatal lift prostheses retentive clasps that engage undercuts formed with composite resin or orthodontic brackets are fashioned from custom bent orthodontic wire that is embedded in the polymethylmethacrylate component of the prosthesis. The orthodontic wire extends from the polymethylmethacrylate to engage the gingival aspect of the composite resin or orthodontic bracket serving to provide the prosthesis' retentive undercut. If the orthodontic wire clasp terminated at its approximation with the dental abutment undercut it engages as do conventional removable partial denture clasps, the interim palatal lift prosthesis could be difficult to insert and remove. Thus, the orthodontic wire clasps used to retain interim palatal lift prostheses are sometimes extended in a mesial direction up to two mesiodistal tooth diameters. Clasps designed in this fashion can be flexed laterally by patients or their caregivers to facilitate the insertion and removal of the interim palatal lift prosthesis.

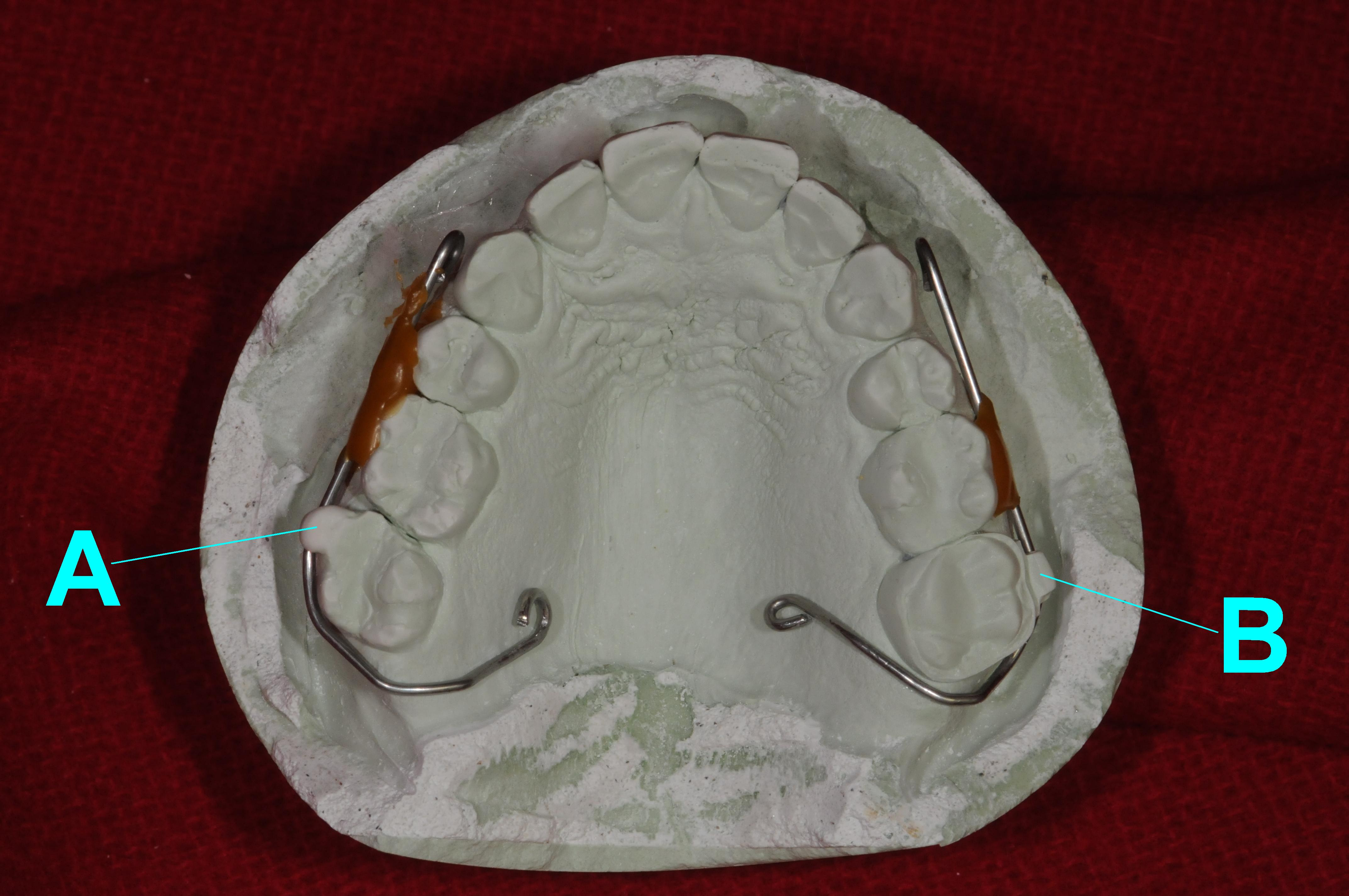
Occlusal view of an interim palatal lift prosthesis master cast with orthodontic wire clasps bent to engage composite resin (A) affixed to tooth number 2 and an orthodontic bracket (B) affixed to tooth number 15

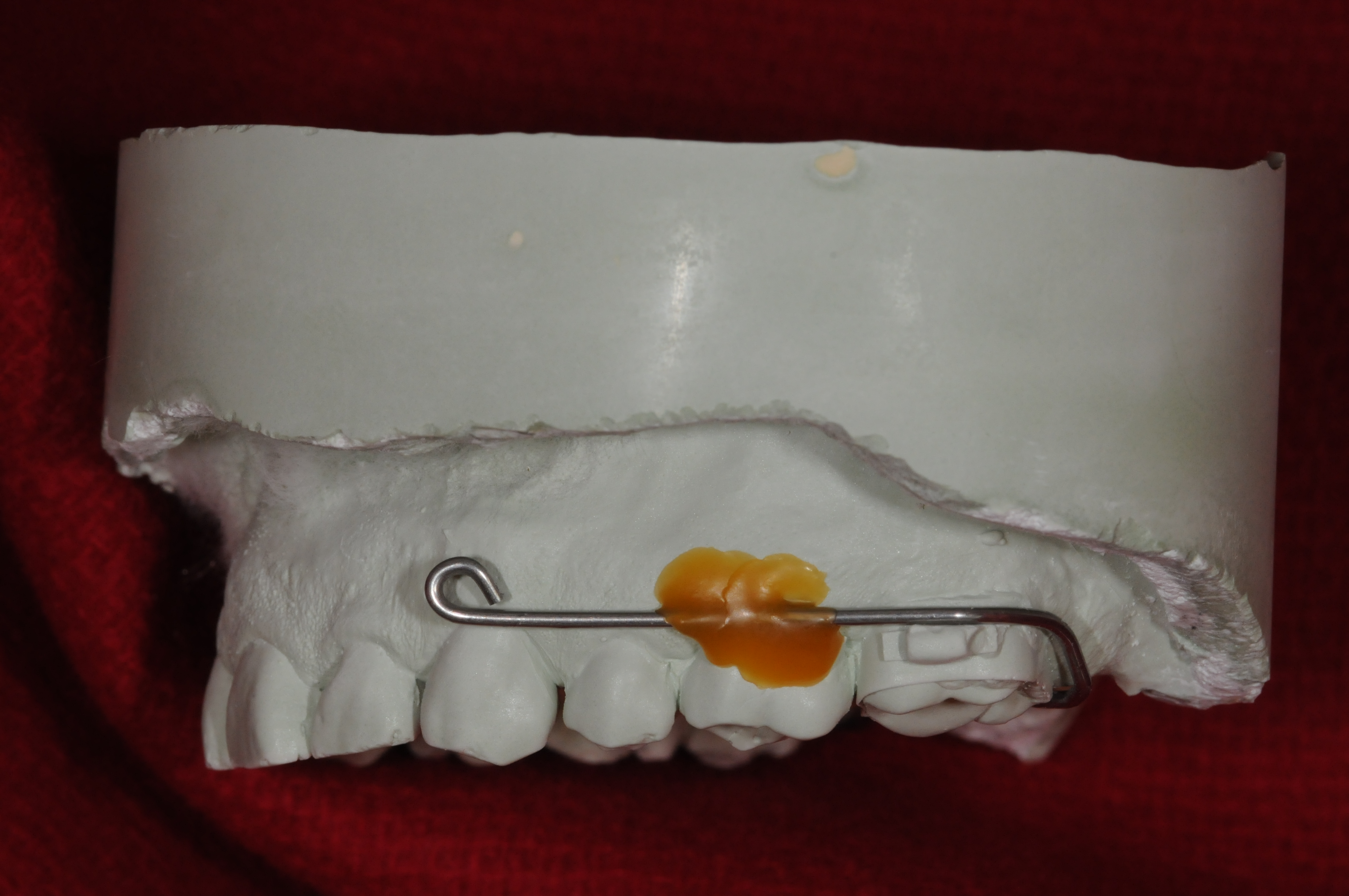
Buccal view of an interim palatal lift prosthesis master cast with an orthodontic wire clasp bent to engage an orthodontic bracket affixed to tooth number 15

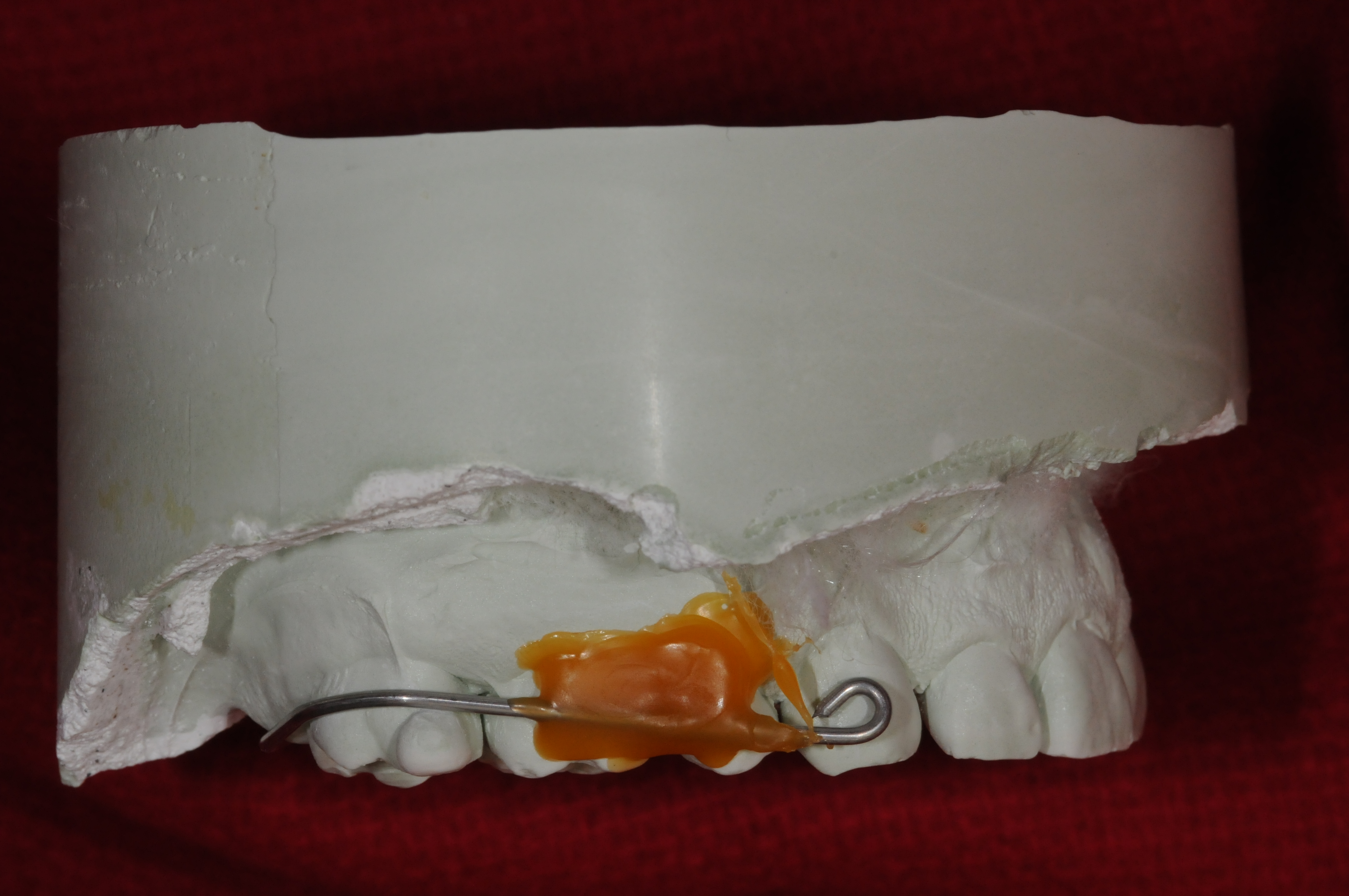
Buccal view of an interim palatal lift prosthesis master cast with an orthodontic wire clasp bent to engage composite resin affixed to tooth number 15

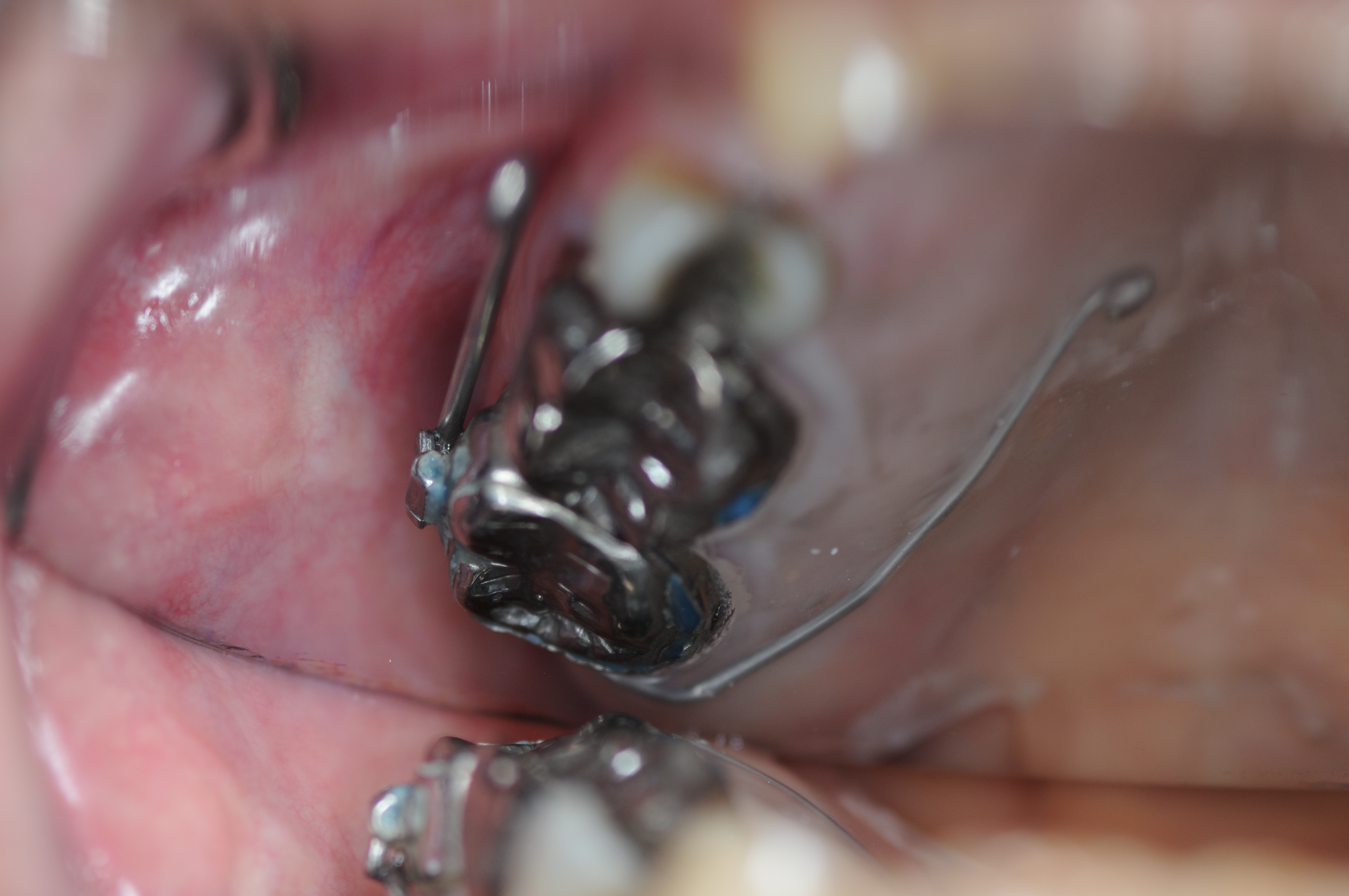
Palatal lift prosthesis clasp assembly engaging a buccal orthodontic bracket on a second maxillary molar

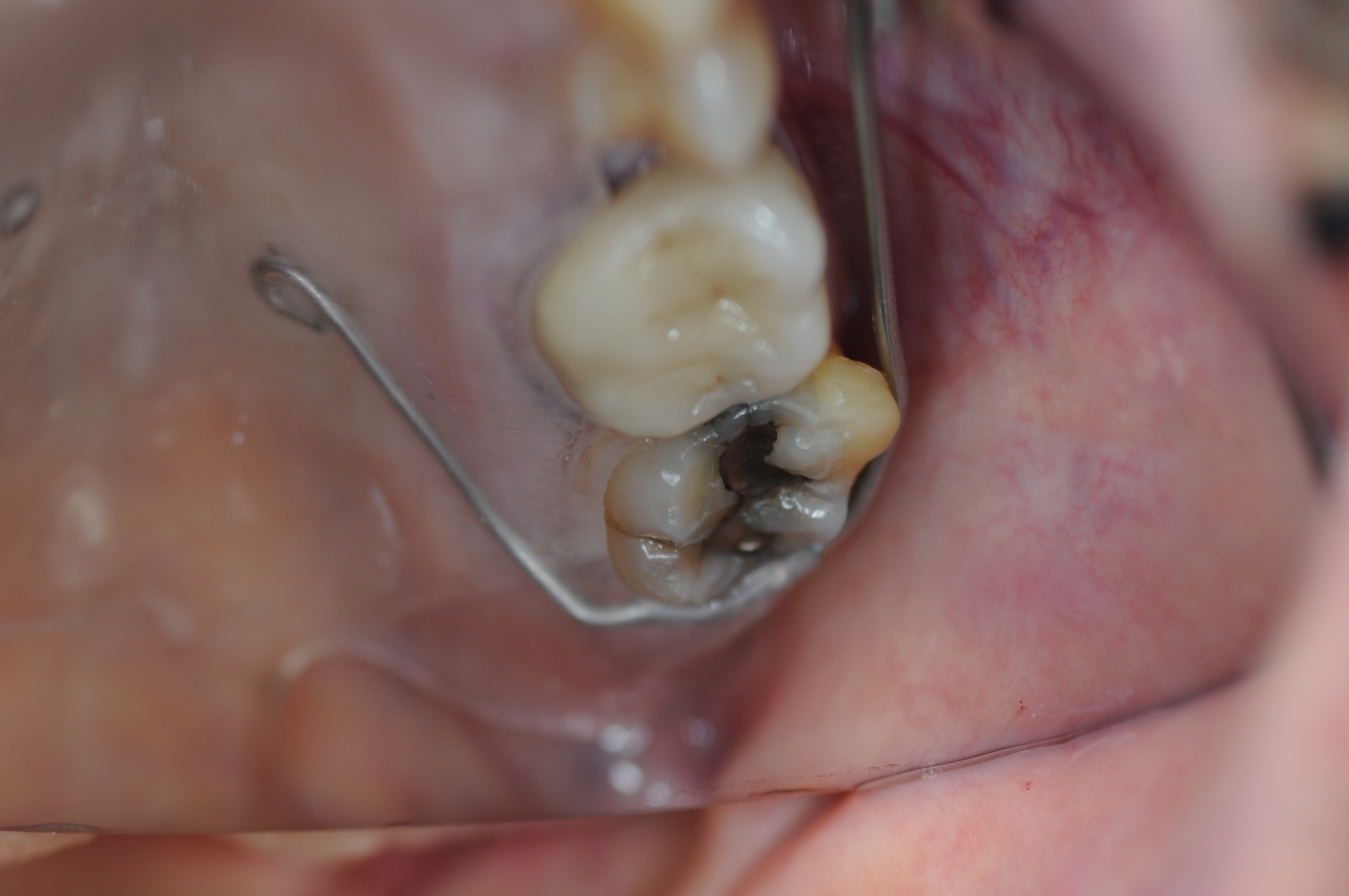
Palatal lift prosthesis clasp assembly engaging composite resin on a second maxillary molar

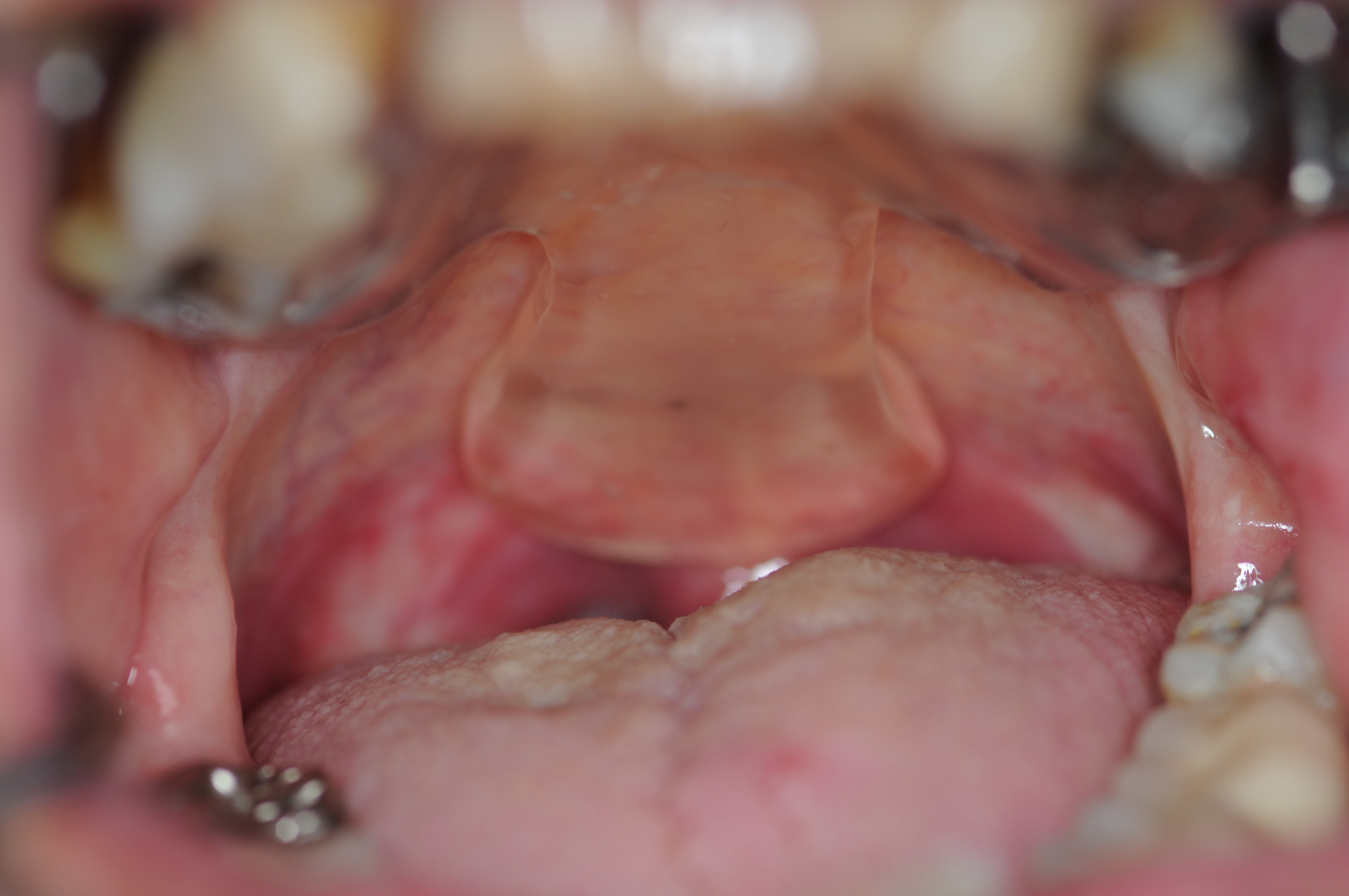
The pharyngeal extension of a palatal lift prosthesis responsible for elevating the soft palate

Definitive Palatal Lift Prostheses Retentive Clasp Assembly

Definitive palatal lift prosthesis clasp assemblies are not unlike those designed for the retention of removable partial dentures. The clasps arise as extensions of a cast metallic alloy prosthetic component termed a major connector that engages the hard palatal mucosa and the lingual surfaces of some or all of the maxillary teeth. Cast definitive palatal lift prosthesis clasps engage dental abutment surfaces harboring what typically represent 0.01 or 0.02 inch undercuts responsible for prosthetic retention. Alternatively, custom bent wrought wire clasps can be soldered to the cast metallic alloy component of the definitive palatal lift prosthesis from which they extend to engage the undercuts responsible for prosthetic retention. Wrought wire definitive palatal lift prosthesis clasps have an advantage over cast metallic definitive palatal lift prosthesis clasps by virtue of their relative resistance to work hardening that can contribute to the fracturing of cast clasps.

== Surgical Alternatives to Palatal Lift Prostheses ==
Several scenarios serve to contraindicate the fabrication of palatal lift prostheses or discourage their use. The physical management of palatopharyngeal incompetence by way of a palatal lift prosthesis might not be well tolerated by patients with strong gag reflexes. Edentulous patients or partially edentulous patients without a sufficient number of dental abutments cannot predictably retain palatal lift prostheses. Dentoalveolar growth and development, pediatric dental exfoliation, and exodontia secondary to periodontitis, carious lesions, other pathoses, or trauma can necessitate the fabrication of successive palatal lift prostheses that may be deemed too costly and/or time-consuming. As such, surgical tactics aimed at mitigating palatopharyngeal incompetence can be employed as a substitute to its prosthetic management. Conversely, prosthetic palatopharyngeal incompetence management can offer a favorable substitute to surgical management when surgical contraindications are encountered.

Pharyngeal Flap Surgery

The superiorly based or inferiorly based pharyngeal flap surgical procedure offers an alternative to the fabrication of a palatal lift prosthesis. A pharyngeal flap surgery unites the posterior pharyngeal wall and the soft palate to definitively occlude the midsagittal aspect of the palatopharyngeal port while bilaterally maintaining patencies between the nasopharynx and oropharynx to facilitate nasal respiration and resonance during the production of nasal phonemes. Since surgical management generally eliminates the need for a palatal lift prosthesis and its incumbent disadvantages, the pharyngeal flap surgical procedure is often favored as a first option for addressing palatopharyngeal incompetence. Nevertheless, patients with minimal lateral pharyngeal wall adduction may be incapable of closing their surgically preserved palatopharyngeal ports following a pharyngeal flap surgical procedure. Such patients can develop residual palatopharyngeal incompetence that could necessitate the fabrication of palatal lift prostheses that occlude the offending nasopharyngeal ports.

Contraindications to pharyngeal flap surgical procedures, thus, include nominal measures of lateral pharyngeal wall adduction. Patients whose lateral pharyngeal walls negligibly adduct necessitate pharyngeal flaps that are wider in a mediolateral direction than patients with dramatic lateral pharyngeal wall adduction. As such, midsagittal pharyngeal flaps designed to be wide enough to mitigate palatopharyngeal incompetence in patients with minimal lateral pharyngeal wall adduction run the risk of being so wide they fail to allow the preservation of bilateral palatopharyngeal ports large enough to safeguard the capacity for nasal respiration. Patients with diminutive bilateral palatopharyngeal ports can postoperatively develop obstructive sleep apnea. With this in mind, pharyngeal flap surgical candidates should undertake a preoperative nasoendoscopic examination by an otolaryngologist, plastic surgeon, or speech language pathologist to assess the degree of lateral pharyngeal wall adduction. A preoperative assessment of such adduction can serve as a surgical guide to how wide a pharyngeal flap must be to be efficacious. Nasoendoscopic evaluations prior to surgery can also diminish the possibility of iatrogenically precipitating obstructive sleep apnea.

Additionally, aberrant pharyngeal vascular anatomy can serve as a contraindication to the pharyngeal flap surgical procedure. Internal carotid arteries within the pharyngeal walls can take an atypical medial course through the posterior aspect of the pharyngeal wall, particularly in patients with velocardiofacial syndrome. Since such anomalies raise the risk of dangerous intraoperative hemorrhaging, contrast enhanced computed tomography and/or magnetic resonance angiography should be obtained in the interest of evaluating pharyngeal vascular anatomy prior to a pharyngeal flap surgical procedure.

Pharyngoplasty

In contrast to the pharyngeal flap surgical procedure that optimally serves patients with ample lateral pharyngeal wall adduction, the pharyngoplasty represents a surgical technique more suitable for patients with soft palatal elevation that is unaccompanied by enough lateral pharyngeal wall adduction to affect palatopharyngeal closure. During a pharyngoplasty, incisions are made into the lateral and posterior pharyngeal walls in an effort to elevate strips of native tissue away from its normal position. These elevated tissues are called flaps and remain pedicled to their native pharyngeal structures as a means of maintaining their blood flow. The flaps are strategically sutured into recipient sites where they provide postoperative tissue volume in areas of the lateral oropharynx and nasopharynx believed not to preoperatively adduct enough to realize palatopharyngeal closure. Pharyngoplasty contraindications and complications are not unlike those considered when preparing for pharyngeal flap surgical procedures. Vascular anatomy must be preoperatively assessed and the provision of lateral pharyngeal wall bulkiness carries the risk of inducing obstructive sleep apnea.

Conditions Potentially Causing Palatopharyngeal Incompetence
Amyotrophic lateral sclerosis
Benign or malignant tumors affecting the 9th, 10th, or 11th cranial nerves
Myasthenia gravis
Cerebrovascular accident
Submucous cleft palate
Cleft palate
Bulbar poliomyelitis
Cerebral palsy
Iatrogenesis secondary to tonsillectomy or adenoidectomy
Traumatic brain injury
Multiple sclerosis
Oculopharyngeal muscular dystrophy
Apraxia

International Classification of Diseases, Ninth Revision, Clinical Modification (ICD-9-CM) Numbers Potentially Associated with the Provision of Palatal Lift Prostheses
784.49	Hypernasal speech
787.2	Dysphagia
784.5	Dysarthria or dysphasia unrelated to a cerebrovascular accident
438.12	Dysphasia associated with a cerebrovascular accident
