= Nasality =

Nasality may refer to:

- Nasalization, phonetic feature of normal speech
- Nasality (disorder), excessive nasalization as a speech disorder
