= Nasometry =

Nasometry refers to measurement of the modulation of the area of the velopharyngeal opening, using movements of the velum and pharyngeal walls, in speech and singing. The velopharyngeal opening connects the oral air passageway with the nasal air passageway. The size of this velopharyngeal opening generally controls the nasality of the resulting speech or singing.

The term nasometry is generally used to refer to non-invasive techniques for measuring the size of the opening, as opposed to endoscopic or other visual methods. During vowel sounds, nasometry usually refers to the use of a system for measuring nasalance. During consonants, nasometry usually refers to the measurement of air escaping past the velum and escaping through the nose. This escaping air is referred to as nasal emission.

Thus, a complete system for nasometry consists of a combined nasalance measurement system and nasal emission measurement system. However, when one or another of these variables is not important, the term nasometry can be used to refer to either measurement of nasalance or nasal emission.

== See also ==
- Nasalization
- Nasalance
- Glottal Enterprises NVS System
- Kay-Pentax Nasometer II
- icSpeech Portable Nasometry Unit
