= Nasal emission =

Nasal emission is the abnormal passing of oral air through a cleft palate, or from some other type of velopharyngeal inadequacy (VPI), during the production of a consonant that requires a buildup of oral air pressure for proper pronunciation, such as /p/ or /s/. The escaping air tends to reduce the oral air pressure and impede the proper production of the consonant. Secondary effects sometimes noted with nasal emission are the development of improper compensatory pronunciation habits, including using a very soft voice that uses less breath pressure. Nasal emission can be detected by a number of simple techniques, such as looking for the fogging of a mirror held under the nares or measured more definitively by means of a nasal pneumotachograph

The measurement of nasal emission in consonants is linked with the measurement of nasalance in vowels under the term nasometry.

== See also ==
- Nasalization
- Nasalance
- nasometry
