= Palatal obturator =

Medical prosthesis

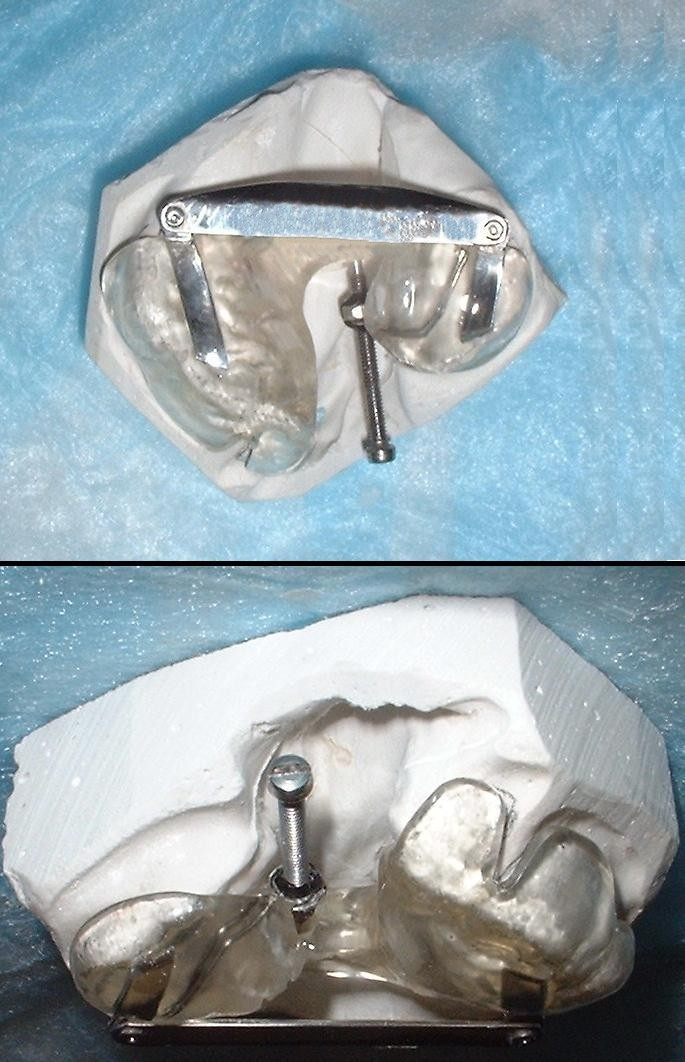
The Latham Device

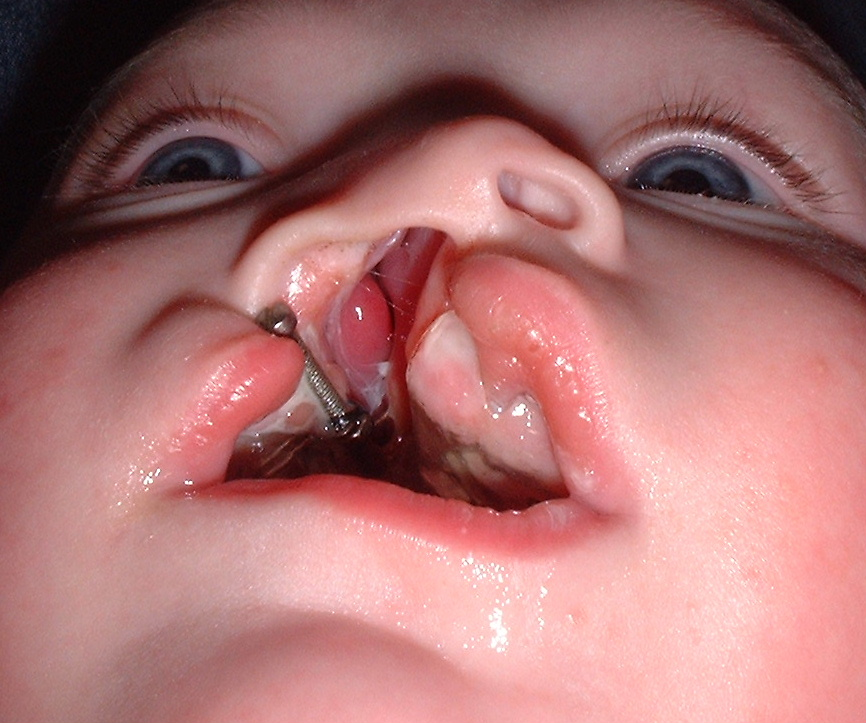
Post Latham

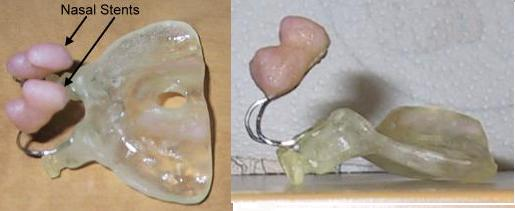
Nasal Alveolar Molding Device

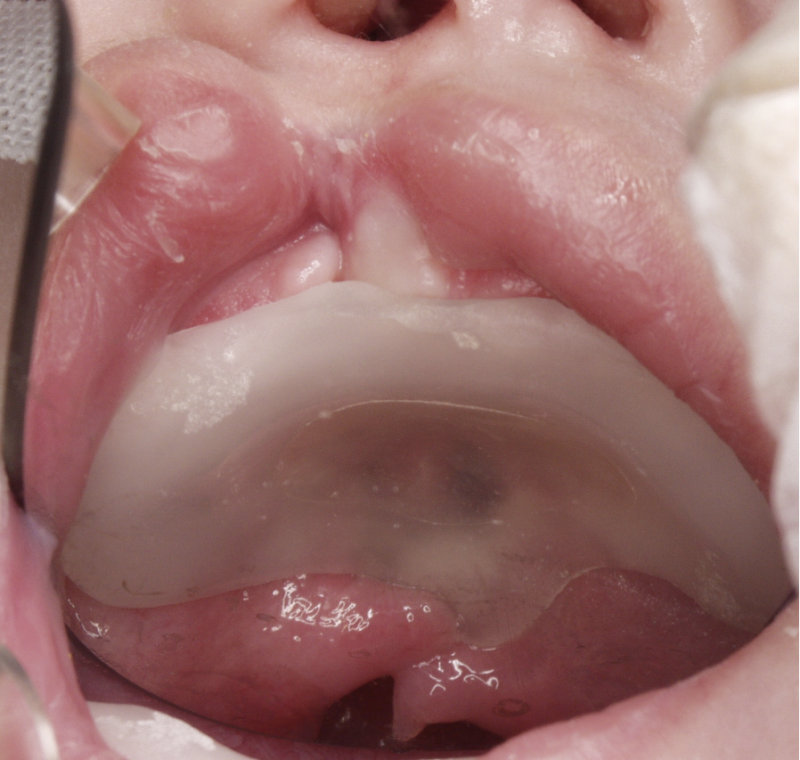
Post Insertion

A palatal obturator is a prosthesis that totally occludes an opening such as an oronasal fistula (in the roof of the mouth). They are similar to dental retainers, but without the front wire. Palatal obturators are typically short-term prosthetics used to close defects of the hard/soft palate that may affect speech production or cause nasal regurgitation during feeding. Following surgery, there may remain a residual orinasal opening on the palate, alveolar ridge, or vestibule of the larynx. A palatal obturator may be used to compensate for hypernasality and to aid in speech therapy targeting correction of compensatory articulation caused by the cleft palate. In simpler terms, a palatal obturator covers any fistulas (or "holes") in the roof of the mouth that lead to the nasal cavity, providing the wearer with a plastic/acrylic, removable roof of the mouth, which aids in speech, eating, and proper air flow.

Palatal obturators are not to be confused with palatal lifts or other prosthetic devices. A palatal obturator may be used in cases of a deficiency in tissue, when a remaining opening in the palate occurs. In some cases it may be downsized gradually so that tissue can strengthen over time and compensate for the decreasing size of the obturator. The palatal lift however, is used when there is not enough palatal movement. It raises the palate and reduces the range of movement necessary to provide adequate closure to separate the nasal cavity from the oral cavity. Speech bulbs and palatal lifts aid in velopharyngeal closure and do not obturate a fistula. A speech bulb, yet another type of prosthetic device often confused with a palatal obturator, contains a pharyngeal section, which goes behind the soft palate.

Palatal obturators are needed by individuals with cleft palate, those who have had tumors removed or have had traumatic injuries to their palate.

== Types of palatal obturators ==
A palatal plate is a prosthetic device, generally consisting of an acrylic plate and retention clasps of orthodontic wire, which covers a fistula of the palate. It may be used to aid in improving articulation and feeding. The blockage of the opening helps improve hypernasality and suckling ability for babies. In the case of a labial-oral-nasal fistula, the plate may include an anterior upward extension to fully occlude the passageway running between the labial surface of the alveolus, alveolus, and nasal cavity. The plate may be constructed to include any congenitally missing teeth to improve articulation and appearance. Individuals who use palatal plates must be monitored periodically by their dental professionals due to possible tissue irritation by the plate. Materials such as food particles, oral mucosa and secretions may cause buildup on the upper surface of the plate; therefore, it is essential to clean a palatal obturator at least twice a day to avoid tissue irritation. There are also more specific terms used for obturators depending on their time and purpose of use: Photo Examples of the Latham Device or the Nasal Alveolar are prime examples for use in Cleft Palate Deformities.

- A modification obturator may be used in the short term to block a palatal fistula, for augmentation of the seal and to separate the oral and nasal cavities.
- An interim palatal obturator is used post-palatal surgery. This obturator aids in closing the remaining fistula and is used when no further surgical procedures are planned. It must be frequently revised.
- A definitive obturator is used when further rehabilitation is not possible for the patient and is intended for long-term use.

Palatal adhesives are oral adhesives or skin barrier materials used to occlude a fistula of the hard palate. Obturators of this type must be removed before eating and drinking. Users must cut the new piece of adhesive and hold it over the fistula until it adheres. Adhesives are not to be used for soft palate fistulae if the soft palate has some mobility due to possible unintentional dislodging and digestion of the material.

== The Nance Obturator ==
This fixed obturator is based on the Nance appliance, which was originally used as a space maintainer in dentistry and orthodontics, but has been redesigned for closing anterior palatal fistulas in patients with cleft lip and palate. The Nance obturator may be used when the surgical closure of the fistula is not feasible and a removable device is not successful.

== Speech ==
Often a palatal obturator is used because a palatal fistula can affect development and proper articulation. As fistula sizes vary, small fistulae tend to result in little to no speech alterations whereas large fistulae tend to result in audible nasal emissions and weak pressure with and/or without hypernasality. Misarticulations, abnormal nasal resonance and nasal escape or air often results from the problem. Fistulae may decrease intraoral air pressure during production of oral pressure consonants causing distortion of sounds as well as increase in nasal airflow. It is common for an individual with a fistula to compensate for a loss of pressure during speech sound production by attempting to regulate intraoral air pressure with increasing respiration effort and using compensatory articulation. Middorsum palatal stops (atypical place of articulation) often results from palatal fistulae causing sound distortions during speech. Occlusion for the fistula is attempted by speakers with deviant tongue placements during these palatal stops.

The palatal obturation may be managed temporarily or may be sustained for longer periods of time. Location-specific palatal obturation has been documented to significantly improve articulation errors, hypernasality (based on listener judgments), and nasal emissions (immediately post-obturation only). Usage of more anterior tongue placements is considered a primary target for speech therapy. The relationship between palatal openings and articulation is important to note prior to surgical plans to ascertain timing of speech therapy and most appropriate therapy goals and approach. Speech therapy may be most beneficial prior to sustained palatal obturation rather than short-term obturation.

== See also ==
- Cleft Palate
- Prostheses
- Dentures
- Prosthodontics
