= Jonathan E. Aviv =

American otolaryngologist

Jonathan E. Aviv (born 1960) is an American otolaryngologist. He is a professor of Otolaryngology–Head and Neck Surgery at the Icahn School of Medicine at Mount Sinai Hospital in New York City and also Clinical Director of the Voice and Swallowing Center at ENT and Allergy Associates in New York City. From 1991 to 2009, he was a full-time academic surgeon and director of the division of head and neck surgery at Columbia University College of Physicians and Surgeons. Aviv invented Flexible Endoscopic Evaluation of Swallowing with Sensory Testing (FEESST), which allows office-based assessment of oropharyngeal dysphagia, or swallowing disorders, without the use of X-ray, and also developed transnasal esophagoscopy (TNE), a method of examining the esophagus without using conscious or intravenous sedation. He has also written a number of books related to acid reflux.

== Early life and education ==
Aviv was born in New York City and raised in Los Angeles. He graduated from Beverly Hills High School and received his bachelor's degree in chemistry at Columbia College of Columbia University, and his Doctor of Medicine from the College of Physicians and Surgeons of Columbia University in 1985. he completed his residency in Otolaryngology–Head and Neck Surgery at the Mount Sinai Hospital in New York and completed a fellowship in micro-vascular head and neck reconstruction in 1990–1991. He is licensed to practice medicine in New York and New Jersey.

== Career ==
=== Medical practice ===
Aviv had an 18-year academic career as an attending physician at the Columbia University Medical Center and as a professor of Otolaryngology–Head and Neck Surgery at the Columbia University College of Physicians and Surgeons. In the Department of Otolaryngology–Head and Neck Surgery he served as Director of Microvascular Head and Neck Reconstruction, Director of Head and Neck Surgery and then Director of the Voice and Swallowing Center.

In 2009 he left Columbia to join ENT and Allergy Associates LLP, based in Tarrytown, New York. There he founded and became clinical director of the practice's Voice and Swallowing Division.

Aviv advocated for widespread in-office screening for esophageal cancer using transnasal esophagoscopy (TNE), and originated Flexible Endoscopic Evaluation of Swallowing with Sensory Testing (FEESST). He has warned of the dangers of "silent reflux" (acid reflux without heartburn pain).

=== National committees ===
In 1997, Aviv was appointed to be a Technical Advisor to the Agency for Health Care Policy and Research (AHCPR) branch of the Department of Health & Human Services, now Center for Medicaid and Medicare Services (CMS) regarding the diagnosis and treatment of swallowing disorders in older patients, which dovetailed with his appointment from 1996–2001 to the Functional Outcomes Task Force on Dysphagia by the American Speech and Hearing Association. He represented the American Academy of Otolaryngology–Head and Neck Surgery as Chairman of its Committee on Speech, Voice and Swallowing Disorders from 1997 to 2003. One of the significant accomplishments during these years was the development of a new series of CPT codes for office-based evaluation and treatment of swallowing disorders which carry on to this day.

Aviv was also President of the American Broncho-Esophagological Association 2005–2006, and the New York Laringological Society in 2004.

=== Publications ===
Aviv has published medical journal articles on microvascular head and neck reconstruction, tongue reconstruction, and a method of restoring sensation to the throat using microsurgical techniques. He has also published numerous journal articles related to FEESST, TNE, acid reflux disease, and cough.

He has co-written textbooks and also written and co-written health and wellness books for the general public on the subject of acid reflux disease.

== Honors ==
Aviv was awarded the Columbia-Presbyterian Medical Center Clinical Trials Award in 1993 as well as the Florence and Herbert Irving Scholarship Award from Columbia University, College of Physicians and Surgeons 1993–1996. He was awarded the American Broncho-Esophagological Association's Broyles-Maloney Award-1995, the Honor Award of the American Academy of Otolaryngology–Head and Neck Surgery in 1997, and the Maxwell Abramson Memorial Award for Excellence in Teaching and Service by Columbia University in 1997/1998.

In 2004 he was selected to give the Chevalier Jackson Lecture to the American Broncho-Esophagological Association, and in 2005 he gave the State of the Art Lecture to the American Laryngological Association. In 2006, Aviv was made a Lifetime Honorary Member of the Israeli Society of Otolaryngology/Head & Neck Surgery.

== Personal life ==
Aviv is married to Samara Kaufmann Aviv, with whom he has published a cookbook for sufferers from acid reflux. He was previously married to Robin Kiam, daughter of Victor Kiam.

== Books published ==
- Aviv, Jonathan E.; Kidder, Thomas M.; McCulloch, Timothy (2001). Swallowing Disorders: Otolaryngologic Aspects. Alexandria, Virginia: American Academy of Otolaryngology—Head and Neck Surgery Foundation. ISBN 9781567720402.
- Aviv, Jonathan E.; Murry, Thomas (2005). FEESST (Flexible Endoscopic Evaluation of Swallowing with Sensory Testing). San Diego: Plural Publishing. ISBN 9781597560009.
- Postma, Gregory N.; Belafsky, Peter C.; Aviv, Jonathan E. (2006). Atlas of Transnasal Esophagoscopy. Philadelphia: Lippincott, Williams & Wilkins. ISBN 9780781751803.
- Aviv, Jonathan E. (2014). Killing Me Softly From Inside: The Mysteries and Dangers of Acid Reflux and Its Connection to America's Fastest Growing Cancer with a Diet That May Save Your Life. North Charleston, South Carolina: Create Space. ISBN 9781494761974.
- Aviv, Jonathan E. (2017). The Acid Watcher Diet: A 28-Day Reflux Prevention and Healing Program. New York: Harmony. ISBN 9781101905586.
- Aviv, Jonathan E.; Aviv, Samara Kaufmann (2019). The Acid Watcher Cookbook: 100+ Delicious Recipes to Prevent and Heal Acid Reflux Disease. New York: Harmony. ISBN 9780525575566.
