= Augmentation pharyngoplasty =

Surgical procedure

Augmentation pharyngoplasty is a kind of plastic surgery for the pharynx (soft tissue at the back of the mouth) when the tissue at the back of the mouth is not able to close properly. It is typically used to correct speech problems in children with cleft palate. It may also be used to correct problems from a tonsillectomy or because of degenerative diseases. After the surgery, patients have an easier time pronouncing certain sounds, such as 'p' and 't', and the voice may have a less nasal sound.

In this surgery, the posterior pharyngeal wall is moved forward, making it similar to an adenoid pad and closing the small gap that interferes with clear speech.

1. Nasal cavity
2. Hard palate
3. Soft palate
4. Tongue
5. Lips
6. Tissue used for surgery

The tongue moves back in the mouth while pronouncing the letter 'k' (or similar sounds). If the soft palate (orange in this image) is cleft, air escapes and a nasal sound is produced instead. The surgery fixes this.

A small stretch of the tissue is attached to the soft palate.

The mouth before surgery.

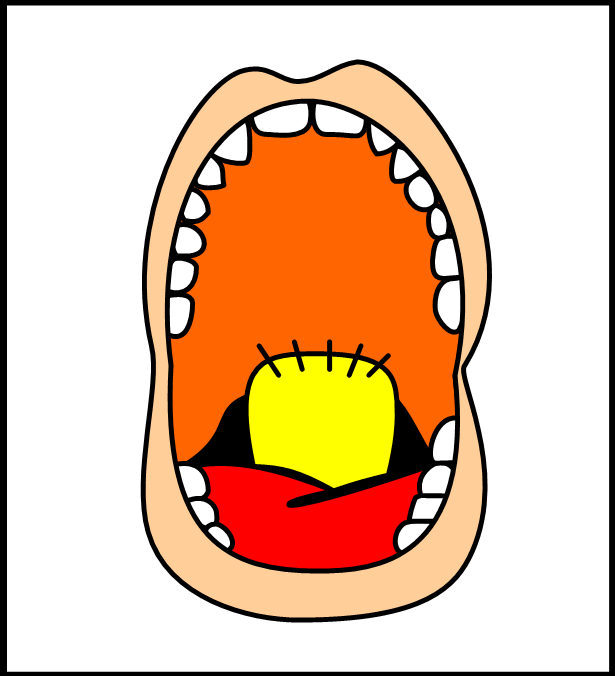
The mouth after surgery. Note the gaps on each side of the flap to regulate the airflow.

Several techniques have been used including: rearranging the soft tissue, implanting cartilage and injection or implanting different types of synthetic materials: (Peterson-Falzone et al., 2001)

- Soft tissue advancement: Passavant (1862), attempted to advance the soft tissue of the posterior pharyngeal wall by suturing two palatopharyngeal muscles in the middle to exemplify Passavant's ridge. Later, he tried to create this ridge by folding a flap of pharyngeal mucosa upon itself. This type of surgery is best for patients with velopharyngeal defects. (Peterson-Falzone et al., 2001)
- Cartilage implants: material, (usually from the patient's rib), is implanted to create an anterior projection on the pharyngeal wall. Most of the time, the success rate is low because the surgeons could not get a large enough sample from the ribs to stay in place in the pharyngeal wall. Later, several surgeons only performed this surgery on patients with openings 5 mm wide or less. The ten patients in this study no longer experience hypernasality or audible nasal emissions. Another study was done under the same circumstances (20 patients with gaps 1–3 mm), and had a much lower success rate. (Peterson-Falzone et al., 2001) Pg 320-321
- Synthetic materials: synthetic materials used to augment the posterior pharyngeal wall include: silicone (Silastic) (Blocksma, 1963), Teflon (Ward et al. 1966, Smith & McCabe, 1977), Proplast (Wolford et al. 1989), and collagen. Many of these procedures were abandoned because results were unpredictable, there were post operative complications or the Food and Drug Administration imposed restrictions. Overall these procedures were deemed undesirable in the long term. (Peterson-Falzone et al., 2001)

== Alternatives ==
Pharyngeal flap surgery is a common alternative surgery.

== Bibliography ==
- Denny, Arlen D., Marks, Susan M., Oliff-Carineol, Susan (1993). Correction of velopharyngeal insufficiency by pharyngeal augmentation using autologous cartilage: A preliminary report. Cleft Palate-Craniofacial Journal, 30 (1), 46–54.
- Peterson-Falzone, Sally J., Hardin-Jones, Mary J., Karnell, Michael P. (2001). Cleft Palate Speech (3rd ed). USA: Mosby.
- Witt, Peter D., O'Daniel, Thomas G., Marsh, Jeffrey L., Grames, Lynn M., Muntz, Harlan R., Pilgram, Thomas K. (1997). Surgical management of velolpharyngeal Dysfunction: outcome analysis of autogenous posterior pharyngeal wall Augmentation. Plastic and Reconstructive Surgery, 99 (5), 1287–1296.
