= Nasal voice =

Speaking voice affected by nasal passages

A nasal voice is a type of speaking voice characterized by speech with a "nasal" quality. It can also occur naturally because of genetic variation.

Nasal speech can be divided into hypo-nasal and hyper-nasal.

== Hyponasal speech ==
Hyponasal speech, denasalization, or rhinolalia clausa is a lack of appropriate nasal airflow during speech, such as when a person has nasal congestion.

Some causes of hyponasal speech are adenoid hypertrophy, allergic rhinitis, deviated septum, sinusitis, myasthenia gravis, and turbinate hypertrophy.

== Hypernasal speech ==
Hypernasal speech or hyperrhinolalia or rhinolalia aperta is inappropriate increased airflow through the nose during speech, especially with syllables beginning with plosive and fricative consonants.

Examples of hypernasal speech include cleft palate and velopharyngeal insufficiency.
