= Denasalization =

Type of sound and sound change in phonetics

Partially denasalized

◌͊
- IPA number: 654

Encoding
- Entity (decimal): &#842;
- Unicode (hex): U+034A
Image

In phonetics, denasalization is the loss of nasal airflow in a nasal sound. That may be due to speech pathology but also occurs when the sinuses are blocked from a common cold, when it is called a nasal voice, which is not a linguistic term. Acoustically, it is the "absence of the expected nasal resonance." The symbol in the Extended IPA for partial denasalization is ⟨◌͊⟩.

When one speaks with a cold, the nasal passages still function as a resonant cavity so a denasalized nasal [m͊] does not sound like a voiced oral stop [b], and a denasalized vowel [a͊] does not sound like an oral vowel [a].

However, there are cases of historical or allophonic denasalization that have produced oral stops. In some languages with nasal vowels, such as Paicĩ, nasal consonants may occur only before nasal vowels; before oral vowels, prenasalized stops are found. That allophonic variation is likely to be from a historical process of partial denasalization.

Similarly, several languages around Puget Sound underwent a process of denasalization about 100 years ago. Except in special speech registers, such as baby talk, the nasals [m, n] became the voiced stops [b, d]. It appears from historical records that there was an intermediate stage in which the stops were prenasalized stops [ᵐb, ⁿd] or post-stopped nasals [mᵇ, nᵈ].

Something similar has occurred with word-initial nasals in Korean; in some contexts, /m/, /n/ are denasalized to [b], [d]. The process is sometimes transcribed as ⟨m͊⟩ and ⟨n͊⟩, with the extIPA diacritic on the underlying phonemes. In phonetic transcription [m͊] and [n͊] are intermediate sounds, not fully oral [b], [d].

In speech pathology, practice has historically varied in whether ⟨m͊⟩ is a partially denasalized /m/, with ⟨b⟩ for full denasalization, or is a target /m/ whether it is partially denasalized [m͊᪻] or a fully denasalized [b]. However, in 2025 the ExtIPA was revised to clarify that ⟨m͊⟩ should be used for partial denasalization; a fully denasalized sound should be written ⟨b⟩. Parentheses could still be used around the diacritic to indicate a lesser degree of denasalization, but an example of that was removed from the extIPA chart as being potentially confusing.

== See also ==
- Nasalization
- Hypernasal speech
