= Remington Products =

American personal care company

- Industry: Personal care
- Founded: 1937; 89 years ago
- Headquarters: Middleton, Wisconsin, United States
- Website: remingtonproducts.com

Remington Products, commonly known as simply Remington, is an American personal care brand which manufactures hair clippers, electric shavers, epilators, and haircare products. It is a subsidiary of Spectrum Brands and Oak Hill Capital.

== History ==
The origins of the "Remington" name date back to the formation of E. Remington and Sons, a firearms maker founded in 1816. E. Remington & Sons made occasional forays into products other than firearms, such as sewing machines and farm implements—but its most significant side venture was when inventor Christopher Sholes persuaded the firearms company to help him develop the typewriter with the QWERTY keyboard, which is still the standard today. In 1886, E. Remington & Sons sold the typewriter company, which became Remington Typewriter Company. This, in turn, merged with the Rand Kardex Corporation in 1927 to become Remington Rand. Remington Rand branched out into making adding machines, filing cabinets, punched card tabulating machines, and other office equipment to become a leading office equipment company.

The origin of Remington personal care products dates back to 1937 when Remington Rand began to branch out to electric shavers, starting with the Remington Model E.

In 1950, Remington Rand bought the pioneering Eckert–Mauchly Computer Company. In 1955, it merged with Sperry Corporation, developer of the automatic pilot, among other devices. The combined company became the Sperry Rand Corporation and continued to market shavers under the Remington brand. In 1979, Sperry Rand sold off a number of its divisions, including the consumer products. Victor Kiam bought the electric shaver company in a leveraged buyout.

Old Remington logo

Victor Kiam's Remington Products Company became very profitable, branching out into other personal care small appliances, buying Clairol's personal care appliance business in 1994. Kiam sold his controlling interest in Remington to Ike Perlmutter prior to the Clairol acquisition that same year. Remington changed hands again in June 1996 when Perlmutter and Kiam sold their controlling interest in the company to Vestar Capital Partners. Victor Kiam died in 2001. In 2003, the Kiam family and Vestar sold Remington to the battery company Rayovac. Rayovac changed its name to Spectrum Brands and markets Remington brand men's and women's electric shavers, hair clippers, beard and moustache trimmers, nose and ear hair trimmers, foot massagers, make-up mirrors, heated hair rollers, blow dryers, and curling irons. Remington also sells flat irons.

== Products ==
Air Plates, ProLuxe, Rose Pearl, Keratin Radiance, Wet2Straight, Shine therapy, Colour protect, Ceramic 210, Ceramic Slim 230, Pro ceramic Extra, Protect, Sleek and Smooth

Remington Products' product line includes Lady Remington, electric shavers for women.

== TV commercials ==
The president of Remington shavers in 1978: "When my wife bought me a Remington shaver, I was so impressed I bought the company". Victor Kiam would often appear in television advertisements for Remington shavers and say: "Shaves as close as a blade, or your money back!"
