= Transnasal esophagoscopy =

- Purpose: examine at risk for esophageal cancer

Transnasal esophagoscopy (TNE) is a safe and inexpensive way to examine the esophagus in patients at risk for esophageal cancer and other disorders. TNE does not require sedation, unlike other techniques widely used to look into the esophagus. This is possible because TNE uses a camera that is passed through the nose, whereas other techniques, such as upper endoscopy, are performed through the mouth, requiring a patient to be sedated. TNE, as it is used today, was developed by Jonathan E. Aviv who published his findings on the first series of TNE that he performed. The origins of the idea to pass the camera through the nose date from 1993 as first described by C. A. Prescott, MD, a pediatrician otolaryngologist in Cape Town, South Africa and further embellished by Reza Shaker, MD, a gastroenterologist in Milwaukee, WI in 1994. The technique began to receive wider attention by ear, nose and throat doctors in 2000, following the publication of findings on the effectiveness of TNE.

TNE is used by both otolaryngologists and gastroenterologists as a diagnostic tool to detect globus, dysphagia, laryngopharyngeal reflux (LPR), gastroesophageal reflux disease (GERD). TNE may also be useful in detecting Barrett's, but there is incongruence between TNE findings and biopsy results. Experts in the field suggest that TNE may replace radiographic imaging of the esophagus in otolaryngology patients with reflux, globus, and dysphagia.

== Technique ==
Transnasal esophagoscopy is an office based procedure in which the patient is anesthetized locally in the nose and sometimes the oropharynx. The scope is advanced into the ipsilateral pyriform sinus and through the esophageal inlet to the stomach, where the esophagus can be examined, with special attention paid to the gastroesophageal (GE) junction. An advantage of TNE over other more invasive cancer screening methods that require conscious sedation is that it can be performed using topical anesthesia alone with the patient sitting upright in an exam chair unencumbered by cardiac monitoring equipment.
