= Victor Kiam =

American businessman and NFL team owner

- Born: Victor Kermit Kiam II; December 7, 1926; New Orleans, Louisiana, U.S.
- Died: May 27, 2001 (aged 74); Stamford, Connecticut, U.S.
- Education: Yale University
- Occupations: Chairman, President and Spokesman of Remington Products
- Known for: Ownership of the New England Patriots; TV ads for Remington
- Spouse: Ellen Lipscher (m. 1956–2001)
- Children: Lisa Lyons Durkin; Victor Kiam III; Robin Kiam Aviv
- Parent(s): Nanon Kiam; Victor Kermit Kiam
- Family: Jonathan E. Aviv (son-in-law)

Victor Kermit Kiam II (December 7, 1926 – May 27, 2001) was an American entrepreneur and TV spokesman for Remington Products, and the owner of the New England Patriots football team from 1988–1991. He was well known for his turnaround of Remington's fortunes, as well as for his commercials written by his director of advertising and sales promotion at Benrus, Howard Shavelson, with whom he first worked on the Playtex Cross Your Heart Bra commercials.

== Biography ==
Kiam was born in the French Quarter of New Orleans, the son of Nanon and Victor Kermit Kiam, a bond dealer who had divorced his actress wife while Kiam was four. His parents both moved away, with his mother going to California and his father to New York. He was educated by his maternal grandfather at Phillips Academy in Massachusetts, where he was a classmate of future U.S. President George Herbert Walker Bush. After serving in the U.S. Navy and attending Yale, the Sorbonne, and Harvard Business School, Kiam worked for Lever Brothers and Playtex as a salesman. He bought the Benrus Watch Company in 1968, selling his majority stake in 1977. He made a fortune as the president and CEO of Remington Products, which he famously purchased in 1979 after his wife bought him his first electric shaver. His purchase of Remington is considered an early example of a leveraged buyout. Remington, which had lost $30 million in the previous three years, made a profit in his first year as owner.

Kiam became famous as the spokesman for the Remington shaver. His catchphrase, "I liked it so much, I bought the company", made him a household name. He recorded each commercial in the native language of the country in which it was broadcast. In the United Kingdom he became a celebrity, appearing on such television shows as Wogan, The Tube, and Through the Keyhole. He also owned other companies, including PIC Industrial Design and TravelSmart.

In 1988, Kiam bought the NFL's New England Patriots from founder Billy Sullivan. The sale did not include Foxboro Stadium, which Sullivan lost in a bankruptcy sale to paper magnate Robert Kraft, and Kiam lost money on the deal. In 1990, Lisa Olson, a Boston Herald reporter, sued Kiam and the Patriots when Zeke Mowatt allegedly exposed himself and made lewd comments to her in the team change room. The incident stirred debate over female reporters in the locker room. Kiam became the center of the controversy when he came to the defense of the players' actions. The episode helped inspire the 2013 ESPN documentary, Let Them Wear Towels.

In his later career, Kiam's business interests moved on from the Patriots, which he sold in 1992 to St. Louis businessman James Orthwein, and Remington, which he sold 50% of to Isaac Perlmutter that same year.

Kiam is also well known for "Lady Remington" jewelry, a direct sales jewelry company specializing in in-home parties. Later, it was renamed Lia Sophia, after his granddaughters, Lia and Sophia. The company was at one point the largest direct selling jewelry in the world and was listed among the top 20 largest direct sales companies by the Direct Selling Association. The direct sales division of the company was closed down in December 2014, when its 25,000 sales advisors in the United States and Canada were laid off.

== Personal life and death ==
In 1956, Kiam married Ellen Lipscher, former wife of film producer Richard E. Lyons. He resided in Stamford, Connecticut at the time of his death. He was 74 and had been suffering from a heart condition. He was survived by his wife, Ellen, and three children, Lisa Lyons Durkin, Victor "Tory" Kiam III, and Robin Kiam Aviv (married to Jonathan E. Aviv), and seven grandchildren, Jenny, Alexander, Sophia, Lia, Caleigh, Nikki, and Blake.

Upon Kiam's death The Times quoted one of his closest business associates in later years, Jonathon Lyons, as saying that he was "a truly remarkable entrepreneur of the old kind – the kind they simply don't make any more".

== Bibliography ==
Kiam wrote the following books about business and entrepreneurship:

- Going for It!: How to Succeed As an Entrepreneur
- Keep going for it!: living the life of an entrepreneur
- Live to Win: Achieving Success in Life and Business
