= JoAnne Robbins =

American

- Education: B.A., Temple University, 1972; M.S., U.W.-Madison, 1973; Ph.D., Northwestern University, 1981
- Occupation: Speech-Language Pathologist

JoAnne Robbins is an American authority on dysphagia and biomedical engineering, and is professor of medicine at the University of Wisconsin School of Medicine and Public Health. For more than three decades she has been a leading researcher in the field of swallowing abnormalities. Her work has uncovered correlations among elderly populations who are at increased risk for pneumonia, choking and other serious medical conditions as a result of dysphagia. Using grants from N.I.H. and the Department of Veterans Affairs, Robbins developed a medical device designed to help people afflicted with swallowing disorders.

== Education ==
Robbins earned a B.A. degree from Temple University in 1972, an M.S. degree from the University of Wisconsin-Madison in 1973, and a Ph.D. from Northwestern University in 1981. She completed a postdoctoral fellowship program through NIH’s National Research Service Award. She is a Board Certified Specialist in Swallowing (BCS-S) and holds a Certificate of Clinical Competence for Speech-Language Pathologists (CCC-SLP). She has published dozens of research papers involving dysphagia and holds several patents.

== Career ==
Robbins holds teaching positions at the University of Wisconsin-Madison and serves as associate director of research at the William S. Middleton Memorial Veterans Hospital.

She has conducted extensive studies on aging. Although motor exercises have been used widely as a treatment for speech problems for many decades, Robbins applied strengthening therapy to swallowing rehabilitation. In 2012, she began a clinical demonstration project which sought to improve swallowing and eating-related care for dysphagic veterans.

In 2013, Robbins introduced a new medical device to provide isometric exercises for treating patients with dysphagia. The product, sold through a company called Swallow Solutions, is an oral mouthpiece which uses sensors to measure pressure at five locations on the tongue.

She frequently speaks via Internet trade portals and at conferences around the United States. She is coauthor of a culinary book targeted for those who have difficulty swallowing. First published in 2002, the book is titled, The Easy-to-Swallow, Easy-to-Chew Cookbook.

== Boards, community service ==
Robbins serves on the board of the American Heart Association’s Stroke Council. She is a past president of the Dysphagia Research Society, and has served on the editorial boards of the American Journal of Speech-Language Pathology, Dysphagia Journal and the Journal of Medical Speech-Language Pathology.
