= Pharyngeal flap surgery =

- Specialty: Otorhinolaryngology

Pharyngeal flap surgery is a procedure to correct the airflow during speech. The procedure is common among people with cleft palate and some types of dysarthria.

== Pharyngeal flap procedures ==
Posterior pharyngeal flap surgery is the most commonly used operation to restore velopharyngeal competence (i.e., develop a functional seal between the vocal and the oral cavity), and therefore correct hypernasality and nasal air escape (Ysunza et al., 2002). Posterior pharyngeal flaps can be based superiorly or inferiorly and the velum can be split transversely or along the midline (Lideman-Boshki et al., 2005). Centrally positioned, superior based flaps continue to be the most popular pharyngeal flap choice, yet inferior based flaps are easier for the surgeon to perform. Compared to superiorly based flaps, inferiorly based flaps are limited in regard to the size of velopharyngeal opening that can be covered (Peterson-Falzone et al., 2001).

Pharyngolasties correcting hypernasal speech can be traced back as far as the 19th century when Passavant first explored palatopexy in a 23-year-old female (Hall et al., 1991). In 1876, Schenborn also attempted to reduce the amount of air entering the nasal cavity by developing the first true inferior based pharyngeal flap surgery, where a flap of tissue was sutured into the velum and attached to the lower end of the posterior pharyngeal wall. Modifying his technique, Schoenborn published a superior based pharyngeal flap surgery in 1886, where the flap of tissue attached to the upper end of the posterior pharyngeal wall is peninsula together. In 1928, Rosenthal used an inferiorly based posterior pharyngeal flap in combination with a modified von Langenbeck palatoplasty in primary surgery for cleft palate repair. Taking a different approach, Padgett (1930) utilized a superiorly based flap for cleft palate patients whose primary surgical repair had been unsuccessful (Sloan, 2000). By the 1950s, posterior pharyngeal flap surgery became widely adopted in the correction of VPI (Peterson-Falzone et al., 2001).

In the 1970s, Hogan and Shprintzen advanced posterior pharyngeal flaps, leading to an increased success rate in the elimination of VPI. Hogan (1973) proposed a ‘lateral portal control’ flap to modulate the postoperative port size. In this flap, lateral ports exist on both sides of the pharyngeal flap to assist in drainage, nasal breathing, and nasal resonance. Using the pressure-flow studies of Warren and colleagues as a basis for lateral port size, Hogan placed a 4 mm diameter catheter through the lateral ports on either side of the flap to tailor the port size to the perception of nasal resonance (Sloan, 2000). Consistent with Warren’s aerodynamic data, Hogan advocated that the velopharyngeal opening be no greater than 4 mm in diameter because a larger gap would most likely result in hypernasal speech (Peterson-Falzone et al., 2001).

In 1979, Robert Shprintzen advocated "tailor-made" flaps, with the width of the flap determined by the degree of preoperative lateral pharyngeal wall adduction. According to Shprintzen, the base of the pharyngeal flap should be positioned at the site with the greatest level of lateral pharyngeal wall movement. In addition, Shprintzen recommends that a narrower flap be used with pronounced lateral pharyngeal wall movement, while a wider flap should be used with limited lateral pharyngeal wall movement. (Sloan, 2000) Use of a narrow flap in individuals with limited preoperative lateral pharyngeal wall movement has the potential to increase lateral pharyngeal wall movement postoperatively (Karling et al., 1999).

== Candidacy ==
Pharyngeal flap surgery may be recommended to resolve velopharyngeal inadequacy after patients prove unable to achieve significant speech improvements through speech therapy alone. Other requirements to qualify for the surgery include a short and immobile or easily fatigued palate (Mazaheri et al., 1994).

The patient’s pattern of VP closure is one aspect that is taken take into consideration by doctors in deciding whether pharyngeal flap surgery is the appropriate method of treatment (Armour et al., 2005). A variety of closure patterns have been found, and the pattern varies person to person. When planning pharyngeal flap surgery, it is imperative for the doctor to match the postoperative structure to the preoperative movements in order for an adequate seal to be achieved (Ysunza et al., 2002). Research has found that pharyngeal flap surgery has been most effective for those with a sagittal closure pattern (good lateral wall movement but poor velar movement (Armour et al., 2005)).

Pharyngeal flap surgery is not recommended for everyone and alternative treatment methods are available. One alternative is the use of a prosthesis. In some instances, a prosthesis is capable of stimulating pharyngeal wall movement, thus aiding in VP closure. Most often, prostheses have been recommended for use in young children (Mazaheri et al., 1994). Currently, no accurate method is available to determine whether a pharyngeal flap or an alternative method will have better results for eliminating velopharyngeal incompetence.

Pharyngeal flap surgery has been completed in both children and adults. When younger children undergo the surgery, fewer speech impairments tend to occur. A possible explanation is that the earlier the surgery, the less likely the child will have developed compensatory strategies to overcome the velopharyngeal incompetence (Armour et al., 2005). However, with thorough preoperative planning, pharyngeal flap surgery can be just as effective in eliminating VPI in adults as it is in children (Hall et al., 1991).

== Complications ==
The most common complications of pharyngeal flap surgery include airway obstruction and obstructive sleep apnea (Pena, 2000). Snoring has also been noted as a possible negative outcome of the surgery (Sloan, 2000). As a result of flap surgery, the airway is compromised in several ways. Some of the issues associated with this compromise include: narrowing of the nasal and oral airway secondary to edema, impeding of the nasopharynx by the flap itself, anatomical changes in which the oropharynx becomes smaller, and decreased respiratory drive following general anaesthesia. There is also a correlation between the individuals who have this surgery and the presence of other craniofacial and neurological conditions. These factors together may lead to the above complications (Pena, 2000).

Postoperative airway obstruction may range from mild stridor events to severe blockage of the airway resulting in tracheal intubation or tracheotomy. All patients should be closely monitored following surgery due to the possible damage to the newly repaired palate or even the risk of death. In the literature, airway obstruction following pharyngeal flap surgery using the Wardill-Kilner and von Langenbeck techniques are well documented. It has been concluded that individuals with Franceschetti syndrome or Pierre Robin sequence are at increased risk for developing airway obstruction following pharyngoplasty due to their shallow nasopharyngeal airway and inadequate maxillofacial growth at the time of the surgery. It is also believed that prolonged duration of the surgical procedure may be directly correlated with an increased incidence of airway obstruction. Age does not seem to influence the risk. Factors that increase the risk of airway obstruction include associated congenital anomalies and a history of airway problems (Anthony & Sloan, 2002).

Sleep apnea can be categorized as obstructive sleep apnea (OSA) or central sleep apnea. The potential health risks of OSA are severe and therefore even a small percentage of incidence is considered significant. Obstructive sleep apnea symptoms must be carefully assessed following pharyngeal flap surgery (Ysunza). This condition was found to be more commonly linked to posterior pharyngeal flap surgery, however, pharyngeal flaps are considered to be more valuable in correcting velopharyngeal function than other treatment options, especially in severe cases of VPI (Sloan, 2000). It has also been reported that large tonsils have been found in a high percentage of OSA cases. Large tonsils may be shifted posteriorly, under the ports of the flap. In superiorly-based pharyngeal flaps, tonsils are a likely contributor to OSA. Surgical procedures such as uvulopalatopharyngoplasties and tonsillectomies may be required to resolve the OSA. Consequently, tonsillar tissue is an important area of pre-operative assessment (Ysunza et al., 1993).

== Outcomes ==
Pharyngeal flap surgery may be able to improve speech performance in children or adults with a cleft palate who have velopharyngeal insufficiency. In fact, there is a high success rate for improvement of speech following pharyngeal flap surgery. However, surgery does not guarantee perfect or 100% intelligible speech. In addition to speech improvements, pharyngeal flap surgery may help eliminate hypernasality, nasal turbulence, and facial grimacing (Tonz et al., 2002). Often, speech improvements are not obvious immediately following the surgery. Speech improvements are more prevalent after one year post surgery and usually continue for several years. The outcomes of pharyngeal flap surgery vary among each individual in regards to improvements in hyponasality, hypernasality, nasal turbulence, voice quality, articulation, and intelligibility (Tonz et al., 2002; Liedman-Boshki et al., 2005).

Patients who undergo pharyngeal flap surgery encounter the risk of never breathing through their nose again, which could create abnormal speech (i.e., denasal resonance) (Witt et al., 1998). It is estimated that around 20-30% of patients with clefts develop hypernasal speech after pharyngeal flap surgery (Heliovaara et al., 2003). The percentage reported for individuals developing hypernasal speech is debated by researchers. It is possible that hypernasality can be a side effect of pharyngeal flap surgery, however hyponasal speech occurs more frequently after a successful surgery (Liedman-Boshki et al., 2005).

It is also possible that pharyngeal flap surgery will be unsuccessful. Some patients may even require secondary surgery for velopharyngeal insufficiency. It is common that individuals who have to undergo a second surgery could develop secondary speech problems, more specifically compensatory articulation and resonance disorders. Problems occurring post secondary surgery are often more difficult to extinguish (Tonz et al., 2002).

As previously mentioned, one problem that may occur after surgery is hypernasality. This is caused when a narrow flap and inadequate lateral pharyngeal wall movement prohibit lateral port closure during phonation. There are several other reasons surgery may fail the first time, including a poorly designed flap such as one that is too narrow, postoperative scar (contracture of the flap), or inappropriate patient selection. Also, the flap may be too wide and occlude the lateral ports. There are higher rates of surgical failure in children with a history of perinatal upper airway obstruction, such as those with Robin sequence (Witt et al., 1998).

The type of cleft, as well as the type of flap used (superiorly or inferiorly-based) does not seem to make a difference in postoperative speech outcomes. It has been reported that different types of flaps give different speech configurations, however the results showed equally good outcomes for postoperative speech, regardless of the type of flap used. Therefore, it is imperative that the surgeon selects the right type of flap for each individual (Liedman-Boshki et al., 2005).

Overall, speech should improve after pharyngeal flap surgery. It is important to remember that improvement is variable and individuals react to surgery differently. Changes in speech do not always occur immediately after surgery, but this does not mean improvements will not be made. Lastly, speech problems such as compensatory articulation strategies do not often extinguish on their own. A speech language pathologist is usually involved both before and after pharyngeal flap surgery to monitor and help improve speech difficulties.

== Alternatives ==
Augmentation pharyngoplasty is a common alternative operation.
