= Passavant's ridge =

Passavant's ridge is a mucous elevation situated behind the floor of the naso-pharynx.

== Anatomy ==
It is also known as Passavant's pad or palatopharyngeal ridge. The prominence of mucous tissue is formed by the contraction of superior constrictor during swallowing. Palatopharyngeus muscle originates from the upper surface of the palatal aponeurosis by anterior and posterior fascicle, which are separated by the insertion of levator veli palatini. Both fasciculi join laterally to form a single muscle that passes downward and backward under cover of the palatopharyngeal arch. In the pharynx, it joins with the salpingopharyngeus muscles and is inserted. A few fibers of palatopharyngeus muscle sweep backward under cover of the Passavant's ridge and form a U-shaped sling of palatopharyngeal sphincter. When the soft palate is elevated it comes in contact with ridge, the two together closing pharyngeal isthmus between nasopharynx and oropharynx.
