= Laryngeal vestibule =

Space in the larynx

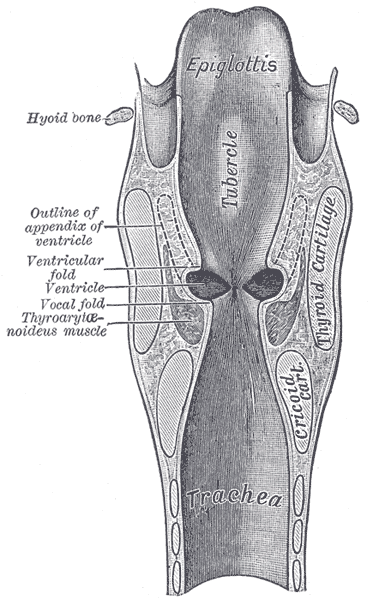
- Coronal section of larynx and upper part of trachea. (Laryngeal vestibule not labeled, but visible near region labeled "Tubercle")

Details

Identifiers
- Latin: vestibulum laryngis
- TA98: A06.2.09.007
- TA2: 3204
- FMA: 55406

The portion of the cavity of the larynx above the vestibular fold is called the laryngeal vestibule; it is wide and triangular in shape, its base or anterior wall presenting, however, about its center the backward projection of the tubercle of the epiglottis. It contains the vestibular folds, and between these and the vocal folds are the laryngeal ventricles.

The vestibule is an opening in the lateral wall of the larynx, between the vestibular fold above and the vocal folds below. It is the inlet to another cavity in the lateral wall of larynx, the laryngeal ventricle. The vestibular fold is formed by the vestibular ligament extending from the lateral walls of the epiglottis to the arytenoid cartilage covered with mucous membrane. The vocal fold is the upper free margin of the conus elasticus which is covered by mucous membrane. The conus elasticus or lateral ligament is the lateral thickened part of the cricothyroid membrane.

== Additional images ==
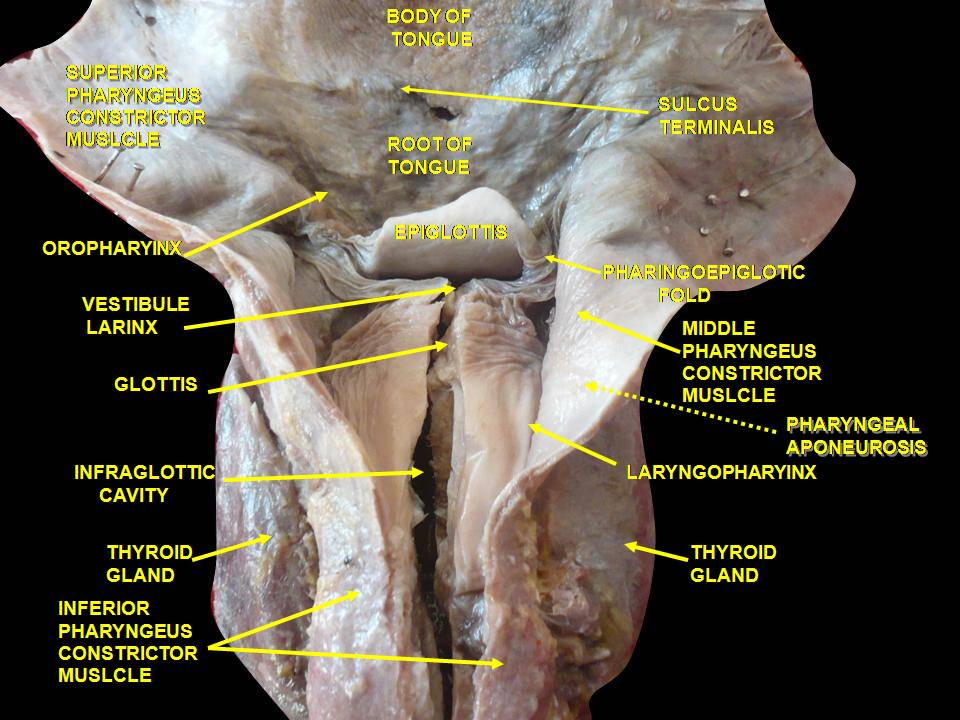
Larynx, pharynx and tongue. Deep dissection. Posterior view.

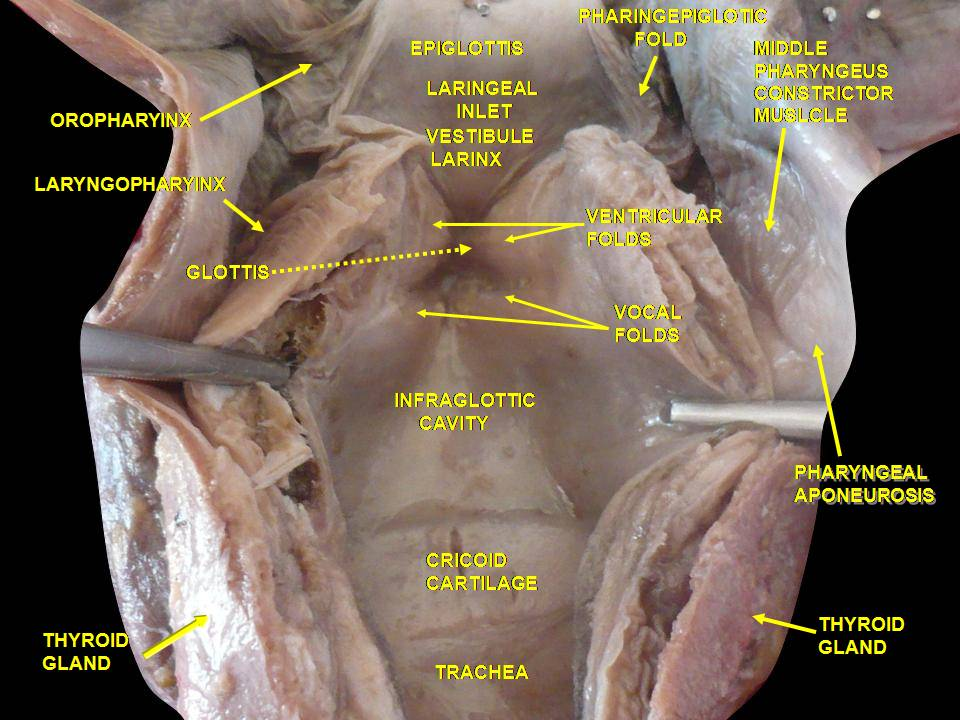
Larynx, pharynx and tongue. Deep dissection. Posterior view.

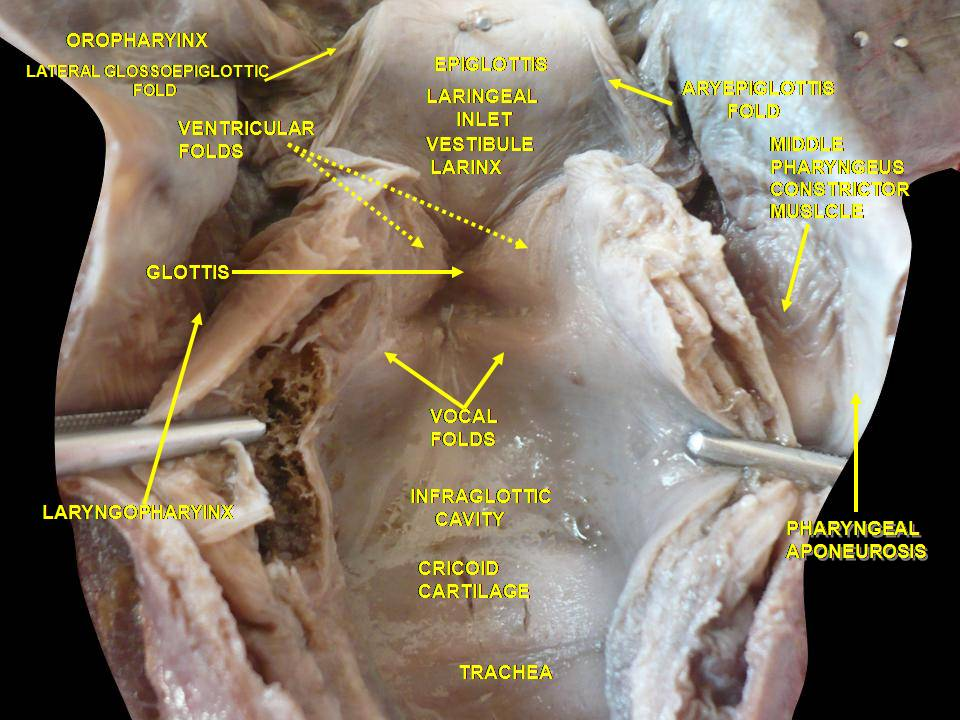
Larynx, pharynx and tongue. Deep dissection. Posterior view.
