= Nasalance =

Nasalance is a measure of the degree of velopharyngeal opening in voiced speech formed by computing the ratio of the amplitude of the acoustic energy at the nares, A_{n}, to amplitude of the acoustic energy at the mouth, A_{m}. The term nasalance usually refers to this ratio as a percentage,

$$\dfrac{A_n}{(A_m+A_n)} \times 100\%,$$

and thus may be more properly expressed as percent nasalance. The term originated in the work of Fletcher and his associates and is now implemented in a number of commercially available devices. There are small differences in the manner in which nasalance is computed in various devices, and differences in the manner in which the oral and nasal acoustic energies are separated physically, as by a hard separator plate held against the upper lip vs. a two-chamber pneumotachograph mask. However, there have been no conclusive studies of the effect of these differences on a relevant underlying physical variable, such as the area of the velopharyngeal opening.

== See also ==
- Nasalization
- Nasality
