= Flexible Endoscopic Evaluation of Swallowing with Sensory Testing =

Flexible Endoscopic Evaluation of Swallowing with Sensory Testing (FEESST), or laryngopharyngeal sensory testing, is a technique used to directly examine motor and sensory functions of swallowing so that proper treatment can be given to patients with swallowing difficulties to decrease their risk of aspiration (food and liquids going into the lungs instead of the stomach) and choking. FEESST was invented by Dr. Jonathan E. Aviv MD, FACS in 1993, and has been used by otolaryngologists (ear, nose and throat doctors), pulmonologists (lung doctors), gastroenterologists (stomach and digestion doctors), intensivists (intensive care specialists) and speech-language pathologists for several decades.

Swallowing consists of two distinct but interrelated processes: 1. Moving food and liquids from the mouth into the stomach through a set of coordinated muscle movements of the mouth larynx, pharynx and the esophagus; 2. Protecting the airway to prevent food and liquids from entering the lungs.

This natural process of swallowing can be disrupted in many ways. The problem can occur when the movements involved in swallowing are restricted due to a tumor, any type of blockage, or paralysis after a stroke. Besides the motor problems, swallowing can be impaired due to sensory dysfunction, meaning when sensation (the ability to feel) is lost or reduced anywhere in the throat area. The loss of sensation can be caused by a problem originating in the brain, such as what happens after certain types of stroke, or it can be a result of a nerve injury or swelling in the actual throat area.

FEESST is the only test currently available which can identify if there is any loss of sensation in the throat area. Before FEESST was invented, all tests of swallowing, be they X-ray based tests (Modified Barium Swallow (MBS) or endoscopy-based tests (Fiberoptic Endoscopic Evaluation of Swallowing (FEES) solely looked at the motor component of swallowing without examining the sensory aspect of a swallow or the ability to feel.

== Technique ==
FEESST is an outpatient procedure involving the passing of a thin flexible scope through the nose to the pharynx. The exam consisting of two parts. First part assesses sensation in the pharynx and airway protection. The airway protection is assessed by sending air-pulses to the throat area that is innervated by the vagus nerve, which is the region of the throat between the top of the vocal folds to the tip of the epiglottis in order to stimulate an airway protective reflex called the laryngeal adductor reflex (LAR). This reflex, which occurs when the tissues of the throat are stimulated, causes the vocal folds to close in order to protect the airway from food going into the lungs. Since the windpipe (trachea) is located so close to the food-pipe (esophagus) this is a critical reflex to be functioning well at all times. Stimulation of this reflex not only results in protection of the airway, it also initiates a swallow. When a swallow is initiated the larynx rises up to two inches, going further away from the esophagus, thereby acting as an additional cover for the airway.

During the air pulse administration part of the test it is determined if the reflex (LAR) that initiates the swallow is being responsive enough. The responsiveness depends on the ability of the vagus nerve to feel so that it can properly send the impulse to the brain to initiate the LAR. If there is any injury or swelling of the vagus nerve, the sensation will be diminished. As a result, the reflex responsible for protecting the airway will be affected. During sensory testing it has been shown that a much stronger stimulus is necessary to elicit the LAR if there is any desensitization to the vagus nerve. The second part of the FEESST test involves giving food to the patient and tracking where the food travels in the throat region. Green food coloring is typically given in the food, to track it as it travels along the natural pink-colored tissues of the throat.

If the food that is given is seen to stick to on one side of the throat, which is called food "residue", that usually means that there is lack of sensation or possibly even a motor/movement problem on that particular side of the throat. The treatment for this discovered throat numbness is to then teach the patient to turn their head to the numb side of their throat when they swallow. This maneuver, called a "head turn", effectively closes off the numb side of the throat, so when they swallow, the food is only exposed to the normal side of the throat, thereby insuring a safer swallow (on the normal side there is no residue so there is no chance of the residue accidentally falling into the vocal folds and then into the lungs (aspiration).

=== Vagus nerve injury ===
When there is damage to the nerve that innervates the throat, the vagus nerve, both motor and sensory function can be affected since the vagus contains both motor and sensory nerve fibers. However, until sensory testing was developed there was no way to assess sensory loss from a vagus nerve injury. One of the most common symptoms of a vagus nerve injury is chronic cough. If a physician looked into the vocal cords of a patient with chronic cough, it would appear they are opening and closing normally, but if sensory testing was performed it would give abnormal results, thus indicating that the sensory nerve fibers of the vagus were somehow damaged. This would allow for a more precise diagnosis and treatment.

Another clinical situation where assessment of laryngeal sensation is helpful is in patients complaining of throat pain. Again, when examining the throat of such patients, if everything seemed to be moving well, then clinicians are often befuddled as to what the source of the throat pain is. With sensory testing, one can demonstrate that the throat tissues are numb, signifying some damage to the sensory fibers of the vagus and thereby identify vagus nerve injury as the cause of the patient's pain. This is called vagus nerve neuralgia, and treatment for neuralgia can then commence.

One always sensory tests both the right and left sides of throat and the sensory levels should be symmetric, that is, the right side of the throat should normally equal the left side. However, if during sensory testing it is determined that one side is normal and the other side has a sensory deficit, then likely something has injured the vagus nerve somewhere along it lengthy course from the brain into the neck. As a result, when there is asymmetric sensory nerve loss, imaging of the neck and brain must be done to see where along the course of the vagus nerve a blockage or injury might have taken place.

== Indications for sensory testing of the throat ==
=== Acid reflux disease ===
Over several decades, primarily due to work with sensory testing performed by gastroenterologists (stomach doctors) and pulmonologists (lung doctors), sensory testing and FEESST have been shown to have additional applications beyond assessing swallowing function.

For example, people with acid reflux disease, especially those with throatburn reflux, usually have swollen vocal cords due to years of acid damage. Untreated acid-injured vocal cords will not have as sharp reflexes as vocal cords that are not swollen. Therefore, aspiration is common in people with chronic acid reflux disease. Sensory testing can quantify and assess the swelling for better treatment. The strength of the air pulse given during sensory testing in acid-injured vocal cords due to acid reflux disease will necessarily be much greater in order to elicit an airway reflex than tissues that are not swollen.
