= Velopharyngeal inadequacy =

- Other names: VPI
- Specialty: Oral and maxillofacial surgery

Velopharyngeal inadequacy is a malfunction of a velopharyngeal mechanism which is responsible for directing the transmission of sound energy and air pressure in both the oral cavity and the nasal cavity. When this mechanism is impaired in some way, the valve does not fully close, and a condition known as "velopharyngeal inadequacy" can develop. VPI can either be congenital or acquired later in life.

== Presentation ==
=== Relationship to cleft palate ===
A cleft palate is one of the most common causes of VPI. Cleft palate is an anatomical abnormality that occurs in utero and is present at birth. This malformation can affect the lip and palate, or the palate only. A cleft palate can affect the mobility of the velopharyngeal valve, thereby resulting in VPI.

== Causes ==
While cleft is the most common cause of VPI, other significant etiologies exist. These other causes are outlined in the chart below:

VPI flow chart compiled from the following sources: Johns, Rohrich & Awada, 2003 and Peterson-Falzone, Karnell, Hardin-Jones,& Trost-Cardamone, 2005

== Diagnosis ==
=== Classification ===
The most frequent types of cleft palates are overt, submucous, and occult submucous.

== Treatment ==
A common method to treat Velopharyngeal insufficiency is pharyngeal flap surgery, where tissue from the back of the mouth is used to close part of the gap. Other ways of treating velopharyngeal insufficiency is by placing a posterior nasopharyngeal wall implant (commonly cartilage or collagen) or type of soft palate lengthening procedure (i.e. VY palatoplasty).

== Inadequacy, insufficiency and incompetency ==
Velopharyngeal insufficiency or incompetency are related labels for this phenomenon, in addition to most common generic- velopharyngeal inadequacy. Velopharyngeal insufficiency is the inability of the velopharyngeal sphincter to sufficiently separate the nasal cavity from the oral cavity during speech. Velopharyngeal incompetency occurs when the soft palate and the lateral/posterior pharyngeal walls fail to separate the oral cavity from the nasal cavity during speech. Although the definitions are similar, the etiologies correlated with each term differ slightly. However, in the field of medical professionals these terms are typically used interchangeably.
