= Nasalization =

Production of a sound while the velum is lowered

Nasalised

◌̃
- IPA number: 424

Encoding
- Entity (decimal): &#771;
- Unicode (hex): U+0303
Image

In phonetics, nasalization (or nasalisation in British English) is the production of a sound while the velum is lowered, so that some air escapes through the nose during the production of the sound by the mouth. An archetypal nasal sound is [n].

In the International Phonetic Alphabet, nasalization is indicated by printing a tilde diacritic U+0303 ◌̃ COMBINING TILDE above the symbol for the sound to be nasalized: [ã] is the nasalized equivalent of [a], and [ṽ] is the nasalized equivalent of [v]. Although not IPA, a subscript diacritic [ą], called an ogonek, is sometimes seen, particularly from Americanists, especially when the vowel bears tone marks that would stack with the superscript tilde. For example, ⟨ą̄ ą́ ą̀ ą̂ ą̌⟩ are more legible than stacked ⟨ã̄ ã́ ã̀ ã̂ ã̌⟩.

== Nasal vowels ==
Many languages have nasal vowels to different degrees, but only a minority of world languages around the world have nasal vowels as contrasting phonemes. That is the case, among others, of French, Portuguese, Hindustani, Kashmiri, Bengali, Nepali, Breton, Gheg Albanian, Hmong, Hokkien, Yoruba, and Cherokee. Those nasal vowels contrast with their corresponding oral vowels. Nasality is usually seen as a binary feature, although surface variation in different degrees of nasality caused by neighboring nasal consonants has been observed.

=== Degree of nasality ===
There are languages, such as in Palantla Chinantec, where vowels seem to exhibit three contrastive degrees of nasality: oral e.g. [e] vs lightly nasalized [ẽ] vs heavily nasalized [e͌]; Ladefoged and Maddieson believe that the lightly nasalised vowels are best described as oro-nasal diphthongs. Note that Ladefoged and Maddieson's transcription of heavy nasalisation with a double tilde was once ambiguous with the extIPA use of that diacritic for velopharyngeal frication, though the extIPA has changed its notation to avoid this ambiguity.

== Nasal consonants ==
By far the most common nasal sounds are nasal consonants such as [m], [n] or [ŋ]. Most nasal consonants are occlusives, and airflow through the mouth is blocked and redirected through the nose. Their oral counterparts are the stops.

=== Nasalized consonants ===
Nasalized versions of other consonant sounds also exist but are much rarer than either nasal occlusives or nasal vowels. The Middle Chinese consonant 日 ([ȵʑ]; [ʐ] in modern Standard Chinese) has an odd history; for example, it has evolved into [ʐ] and [ɑɻ] (or [ɻ] and [ɚ] respectively, depending on accents) in Standard Chinese; [z]/[ʑ] and [n] in Hokkien; [z]/[ʑ] and [n]/[n̠ʲ] while borrowed into Japan. It seems likely that it was once a nasalized fricative, perhaps a palatal [ʝ̃].

In Coatzospan Mixtec, fricatives and affricates are nasalized before nasal vowels even when they are voiceless. In Hupa, the velar nasal /ŋ/ often has the tongue not make full contact, resulting in a nasalized approximant, [ɰ̃]. It is cognate with a nasalized palatal approximant [ȷ̃] in other Athabaskan languages.

In Umbundu, phonemic /ṽ/ contrasts with the (allophonically) nasalized approximant [w̃] and so is likely to be a true fricative rather than an approximant. In Old and Middle Irish, the lenited ⟨m⟩ was a nasalized bilabial fricative [β̃].

Ganza has a phonemic nasalized glottal stop [ʔ̃] while Sundanese has it allophonically; nasalized stops can occur only with pharyngeal articulation or lower, or they would be simple nasals. Nasal flaps are common allophonically. Many West African languages have a nasal flap [ɾ̃] (or [n̆]) as an allophone of /ɾ/ before a nasal vowel; voiced retroflex nasal flaps are common intervocalic allophones of /ɳ/ in South Asian languages.

A nasal trill [r̃] has been described from some dialects of Romanian, and is posited as an intermediate historical step in rhotacism. However, the phonetic variation of the sound is considerable, and it is not clear how frequently it is actually trilled. Some languages contrast /r, r̃/ like Toro-tegu Dogon and Inor. A nasal lateral has been reported for some languages, Nzema contrasts /l, l̃/, Nemi contrasts /w, w̥, h, w̃, w̥̃, h̃/.

Other languages, such as the Khoisan languages of Khoekhoe and Gǀui, as well as several of the !Kung languages, include nasal click consonants. Nasal clicks are typically with a nasal or superscript nasal preceding the consonant (for example, velar-dental ⟨ŋ͡ǀ⟩ or ⟨ᵑǀ⟩ and uvular-dental ⟨ɴ͡ǀ⟩ or ⟨ᶰǀ⟩). Nasalised laterals such as [‖̃] (a nasalised lateral alveolar click) are easy to produce but rare or nonexistent as phonemes; nasalized lateral clicks are common in Southern African languages such as Zulu. Often when /l/ is nasalised, it becomes [n].

== Nasal fricatives ==
Nasal fricative

◌̾

◌͋

Encoding
- Entity (decimal): &#830;
- Unicode (hex): U+033E
Image

Besides nasalized oral fricatives, there are true nasal fricatives, or anterior nasal fricatives, previously called nareal fricatives. These are sometimes produced by people with disordered speech due to velopharyngeal-port incompetence. The turbulence in the airflow characteristic of fricatives is produced not in the mouth but at the anterior nasal port, the narrowest part of the nasal cavity. (Turbulence can also be produced at the posterior nasal port, or velopharyngeal port, when that port is narrowed – see velopharyngeal fricative. With anterior nasal fricatives, the velopharyngeal port is open.)

An upright tilde is used for this in the extensions to the IPA: [n̾] is a voiced alveolar nasal fricative, with no airflow out of the mouth; this will generally occur when [n] is intended. [v̾] is an oral fricative with simultaneous nasal frication; this will generally occur when [v] is intended.

No known language makes use of nasal fricatives in non-disordered speech.

== Denasalisation ==
Partially denasalized

◌͊
- IPA number: 654

Encoding
- Entity (decimal): &#842;
- Unicode (hex): U+034A
Image

Nasalization may be lost over time. There are also denasal sounds, which sound like nasals spoken with a head cold. They may be found in non-pathological speech as a language loses nasal consonants, as in Korean. [m͊] is a sound partway between [m] and [b].

== Contextual nasalisation ==
Vowels assimilate to surrounding nasal consonants in many languages, such as Thai, creating nasal vowel allophones. Some languages exhibit a nasalization of segments adjacent to phonemic or allophonic nasal vowels, such as Apurinã.

Contextual nasalization can lead to the addition of nasal vowel phonemes to a language. That happened in French, most of whose final consonants disappeared, but its final nasals made the preceding vowels become nasal, which introduced a new distinction into the language. An example is vin blanc [vɛ̃ blɑ̃] 'white wine', ultimately from Latin vinum and blancum.

== See also ==
- Eclipsis, a similar process in Gaelic that is often called "nasalization"
- Nasal consonant
- Nasal release
- Nasal vowel
- Nasality
- Prenasalised consonant

== Works cited ==
- Ladefoged, Peter; Maddieson, Ian (1996). The Sounds of the World's Languages. Oxford: Blackwell. ISBN 0-631-19815-6.
