= Hypernasal speech =

Abnormal vocal sound due to excess airflow through the nose during speech

Hypernasality
- Other names: Hyperrhinolalia, open nasality, rhinolalia aperta
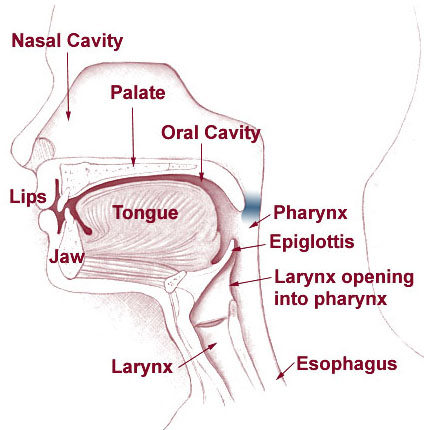
- Nasal and oral cavities with the velopharyngeal sphincter highlighted in blue

Hypernasal speech is a disorder that causes abnormal resonance in a human's voice due to increased airflow through the nose during speech. It is caused by an open nasal cavity resulting from an incomplete closure of the soft palate and/or velopharyngeal sphincter (velopharyngeal insufficiency). In normal speech, nasality is referred to as nasalization and is a linguistic category that can apply to vowels or consonants in a specific language. The primary underlying physical variable determining the degree of nasality in normal speech is the opening and closing of a velopharyngeal passageway between the oral vocal tract and the nasal vocal tract. In the normal vocal tract anatomy, this opening is controlled by lowering and raising the velum or soft palate, to open or close, respectively, the velopharyngeal passageway.

== Anatomy ==
The palate comprises two parts, the hard palate (palatum durum) and the soft palate (palatum molle), which is connected to the uvula. The movements of the soft palate and the uvula are made possible by the velopharyngeal sphincter. During speech or swallowing, the soft palate lifts against the back throat wall to close the nasal cavity. When producing nasal consonants (such as "m", "n", and "ng"), the soft palate remains relaxed, thereby enabling the air to go through the nose.

The Eustachian tube, which opens near the velopharyngeal sphincter, connects the middle ear and nasal pharynx. Normally, the tube ensures aeration and drainage (of secretions) of the middle ear. Narrow and closed at rest, it opens during swallowing and yawning, controlled by the tensor veli palatini and the levator veli palatini (muscles of the soft palate). Children with a cleft palate have difficulties controlling these muscles and thus are unable to open the Eustachian tube. Secretions accumulate in the middle ear when the tube remains dysfunctional over a long period of time, which causes hearing loss and middle ear infections. Ultimately, hearing loss can lead to impaired speech and language development.

== Causes ==
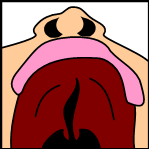
Incomplete cleft palate

The general term for disorders of the velopharyngeal valve is velopharyngeal dysfunction (VPD). It includes three subterms: velopharyngeal insufficiency, velopharyngeal inadequacy, and velopharyngeal mislearning.

- Velopharyngeal insufficiency can be caused by an anatomical abnormality of the throat. It occurs in children with a history of cleft palate or submucous cleft, who have short or otherwise abnormal vela. Velopharyngeal insufficiency can also occur after adenoidectomy.
- Velopharyngeal incompetence is a defective closure of the velopharyngeal valve due to its lack of speed and precision. It is caused by a neurologic disorder or injury (e.g. cerebral palsy or traumatic brain injury).
- Sometimes children present no abnormalities yet still have hypernasal speech: this can be due to velopharyngeal mislearning, indicating that the child has been imitating or has never learned how to use the valve correctly.

== Diagnosis ==
There are several methods for diagnosing hypernasality.

- A speech therapist listens to and records the child while analysing perceptual speech. In hypernasality, the child cannot produce oral sounds (vowels and consonants) correctly. Only the nasal sounds can be correctly produced. A hearing test is also desirable.
- A mirror is held beneath the nose while the child pronounces the vowels. Nasal air escape, and thus hypernasality, is indicated if the mirror fogs up.
- A pressure-flow technique is used to measure velopharyngeal orifice area during the speech. The patient must be at least three to four years old.
- A video nasopharyngeal endoscopy observes velopharyngeal function, movements of the soft palate, and pharyngeal walls. It utilises a very small scope placed in the back of the nasal cavity. The doctor will then ask the child to say a few words. The patient must be at least three to four years old to ensure cooperation.
- A cinefluoroscopy gives dynamic visualisation and can easier be applied to younger children, though it has the disadvantage of exposing the patient to radiation.
- A nasometer calculates the ratio of nasality. The patient wears a headset, where the oral and nasal cavities are separated by a physical plate. On both sides of the plate are microphones. The ratio calculated by the nasometer indicates the amount of nasality, with a higher ratio indicating more nasality.

=== Effects on speech ===
Hypernasality is generally segmented into so-called 'resonance' effects in vowels and some voiced or sonorant consonants and the effects of excess nasal airflow during those consonants requiring a buildup of oral air pressure, such as stop consonants (as /p/) or sibilants (as /s/). The latter nasal airflow problem is termed 'nasal emission', and acts to prevent the buildup of air pressure and thus prevent the normal production of the consonant. In testing for resonance effects without the aid of technology, speech pathologists are asked to rate the speech by listening to a recorded sentence or paragraph, though there is much variability in such subjective ratings, for at least two reasons. First, the acoustic effect of a given velopharyngeal opening varies greatly depending on the degree of occlusion of the nasal passageways. (This is the reason why a stuffy nose from an allergy or cold will sound more nasal than when the nose is clear.) Secondly, for many persons with hypernasal speech, especially hearing impaired, there are also mispronunciations of the articulation of the vowels. It is extremely difficult to separate the acoustic effects of hypernasality from the acoustic effects of mispronounced vowels (examples). Of course, in speech training of the hearing impaired, there is little possibility of making nasality judgments aurally, and holding a finger to the side of the nose, to feel voice frequency vibration, is sometimes recommended.

== Treatment ==
=== Speech therapy ===
In cases of muscle weakness or cleft palate, special exercises can help to strengthen the soft palate muscles with the ultimate aim of decreasing airflow through the nose and thereby increasing intelligibility. Intelligibility requires the ability to close the nasal cavity, as all English sounds, except the nasal sounds "m" [m], "n" [n], and "ng" [ŋ], have airflow only through the mouth. Normally, by age three, a child can raise the muscles of the soft palate to close the nasal cavity.

Severe functional issues, such as velopharyngeal insufficiency should be treated surgically as they cannot be treated through speech-language pathology. Speech therapy can be recommended post-surgery to correct any residual articulation disorders due to mislearning during presence of a functional deficiency.

Without the use of a technological aid, nasal emission is sometimes judged by listening for any turbulence that may be produced by the nasal airflow, as when there is a small velopharyngeal opening and there is some degree of mucus in the opening. More directly, methods recommended include looking for the fogging of a mirror held near the nares or listening through a tube, the other end of which is held in or near a nares opening.

There have been many attempts to use technological augmentation more than a mirror or tube to aid the speech pathologist or provide meaningful feedback to the person attempting to correct their hypernasality. Among the more successful of these attempts, the incompleteness of velopharyngeal closure during vowels and consonants that causes nasal resonance can be estimated and displayed for evaluation or biofeedback in speech training through the nasalance of the voice, with nasalance defined as a ratio of acoustic energy at the nostrils to that at the mouth, with some form of acoustic separation present between the mouth and nose.

==== CPAP ====
There is insufficient evidence to support the use of traditional non-speech oral motor exercises can reduce hypernasality. Velopharyngeal closure patterns and their underlying neuromotor control may differ for speech and nonspeech activities. Therefore, the increase in velar movement through blowing, sucking, and swallowing may not transfer to speech tasks. Thus, hypernasality remains while individual speak. Kuehn proposed a new way of treatment by using a CPAP machine during speech tasks. The positive pressure provided by a CPAP machine provides resistance to strengthen velopharyngeal muscles. With nasal mask in place, an individual is asked to produce VNCV syllables and short sentences. It is believed that CPAP therapy can increase both muscle endurance as well as strength because it overloads the levator veli palatini muscle and involves a regimen with a large number of repetitions of velar elevation. Research findings proved that patients with hypernasality due to flaccid dysarthria, TBI or cleft palate do eliminate hypernasality after receiving this training program.

=== Surgery ===
The two main surgical techniques for correcting the aberrations the soft palate present in hypernasality are the posterior pharyngeal flap and the sphincter pharyngoplasty. After surgical interventions, speech therapy is necessary to learn how to control the newly constructed flaps.

==== Posterior pharyngeal flap ====
Posterior pharyngeal flap surgery is mostly used for vertical clefts of the soft palate. The surgeon cuts through the upper layers of the back of the throat, creating a small square of tissue. This flap remains attached on one side (usually at the top). The other side is attached to (parts of) the soft palate. This ensures that the nasal cavity is partially separated from the oral cavity. When the child speaks, the remaining openings close from the side due to the narrowing of the throat caused by the muscle movements necessary for speech. In a relaxed state, the openings allow breathing through the nose.

==== Sphincter pharyngoplasty ====
Sphincter pharyngoplasty is mostly used for horizontal clefts of the soft palate. Two small flaps are made on the left and right side of the entrance to the nasal cavity, attached to the back of the throat. For good results, the patient must have good palatal motion, as the occlusion of the nasal cavity is mainly carried out by muscles already existing and functioning.

==== Complications ====
The most common complications of the posterior pharyngeal wall flap are hyponasality, nasal obstruction, snoring, and sleep apnea. Rarer complications include flap separation, sinusitis, postoperative bleeding, and aspiration pneumonia. Possible complications of the sphincter pharyngoplasty are snoring, nasal obstruction, difficulty blowing the nose.

Some researches suggest that sphincter pharyngoplasty introduces less hyponasality and obstructive sleep symptoms than the posterior pharyngeal wall flap. Both surgeries have a favourable effect on the function of the Eustachian tube.

== See also ==
- Rhinolalia clausa
- Nasalization
- Nasalance
- Velotrace
