= General Snyder =

General Snyder may refer to:

- Donald Snyder (general) (born 1936), U.S. Air Force lieutenant general
- Howard McCrum Snyder (1881–1970), U.S. Army major general
- Oscar P. Snyder (1895–1983), U.S. Army major general

== See also ==
- General Schneider (disambiguation)
