= Vomer flap surgery =

Vomer flap surgery was used prior to 1975 as a surgical treatment for children with cleft palate. In this procedure, the vomer bone was used to reconstruct the palate and cover the cleft.

== Vomer flap procedure ==
The vomer is a triangle shaped bone that forms the inferior and posterior portion of the nasal septum (www.emedicine.com/plastic/topic519.htm). A vomer flap is a type of palatoplasty surgery that uses the mucoperiosteal tissue of the vomer to cover a unilateral or bilateral cleft palate. This procedure can be used to reconstruct the nasal or oral surfaces by either raising the vomer or creating a flap. Surgical procedures can be combined according to type of clefting in order to ensure the best outcomes for the patient. Vomer flap surgery involves the suture line of the vomer bone which is an important site for midface growth. In this case, a suture line refers to boundary between two bony plates which eventually grow together as the child matures.

== Vomer flap and mid-facial growth ==
Over the years, argument has been raised about the possible interference the vomer flap surgery has with midface growth in children. In 1975, defective mid-facial growth found in some patients caused the vomer flap procedure to begin to decline drastically in surgical use (Friede and Johanson, 1977). A debate still exists among researchers and surgeons in regards to the relationship between vomer flap surgery and defective midface growth. Some contemporary surgeons continue to use the vomer flap technique in the nasal lining of patients with cleft palate. A study that compared the effects of vomerine flap closure of the hard palate at the time of lip repair with non-closure of the hard palate in subjects with a unilateral cleft lip and palate found that the decrease of alveolar arch gap width at palate repair (6 months) in the vomerine flap group was significantly more than the decrease observed in the non-vomerine flap group, and there was no significant decrease in the anterior and posterior arch width or anteroposterior length of the hard palate in the vomerine flap group compared with the non-vomerine flap group (Maggiulli et al., 2014).

== Advantages and disadvantages ==
Few advantages of the vomer flap procedure include the relative simple execution compared to other palatoplasties, amount of surgery time, and similarity between the vomer tissue and the nasal mucosa. A major disadvantage of the vomer flap surgery is the varying size and visibility of the vomer in different patients. If the vomer is not visible or too small to cover the cleft, the procedure cannot be done. Another disadvantage of the use of the vomer flap in the oral cavity is that the vomer tissue does not aesthetically match the oral mucosa. The color and texture of the vomer mucosa matches the nasal mucosa much better than the oral mucosa. Sometimes, patients are displeased and uncomfortable with the visible vomer flap in the oral cavity.
