= Gerald M. Bowers =

American periodontist (born 1928)

Gerald Miles Bowers (born September 10, 1928) is an American periodontist known for research and contributions to the field of regenerative therapy in periodontics. He and his colleagues demonstrated for the first time conclusive histologic evidence that demineralized bone matrix used as a bone graft supports periodontal regeneration in humans.

== Early life and education ==
Bowers was born in Trenton, Michigan on September 10, 1928. He received his bachelor's degree from the University of Michigan in 1950 and his DDS from the University of Michigan in 1954. He received a certificate in general dentistry from the Navy Dental School in 1960 and completed his master's degree and certificate in periodontology from Ohio State University in 1962.

== Career ==
Bowers was the director of the postdoctoral fellowship program at the Periodontal Clinic in Washington, D.C. from 1964-67. He was chairman of the Department of Periodontics at the Naval Graduate Dental School in Bethesda from 1969 to 1974. At the same time, he was a clinical associate professor and professorial lecturer at Georgetown University. From 1974 to 1996, he was a professor and the director of the postdoctoral program in periodontics at the Baltimore College of Dental Surgery where he is currently professor emeritus.

He served as the personal periodontist to President Lyndon B. Johnson during his presidency. The Gerald M. Bowers Study Club and Gerald M. Bowers Endowment Fund for the American Board of Periodontology are named in his honor. He is the principal author or co-author of one textbook and 41 peer-reviewed journal articles. His most cited paper has over 300 citation in Google Scholar

== Awards ==
- The Ohio State University Distinguished Alumni Award for Outstanding Achievement In Periodontal Research (1985)
- The A.A.P. Gold Medal Award (1992)
- The William J. Gies Award for achievement In Periodontology (1984 and 1987)
