= Cleft lip and cleft palate =

Birth defect of the palate and upper lip

Cleft lip and palate
- Other names: Hare-lip, cleft lip and palate
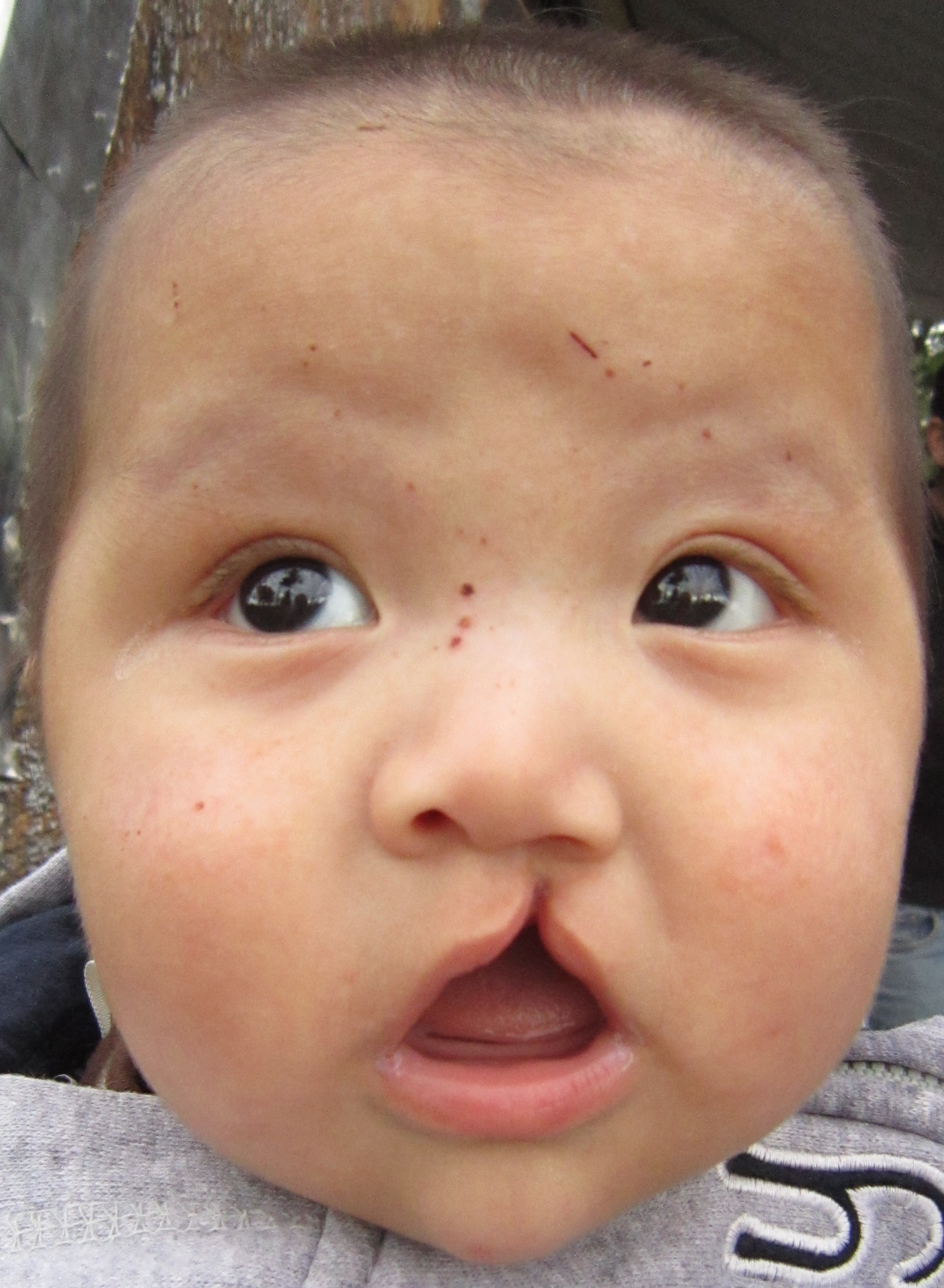
- Child with incomplete unilateral cleft lip
- Specialty: Oral and Maxillofacial Surgery, Otorhinolaryngology, pediatrics
- Symptoms: Opening in the upper lip that may extend into the nose or palate
- Complications: Feeding problems, speech problems, hearing problems, frequent ear infections
- Usual onset: Present at birth
- Causes: Usually unknown
- Risk factors: Smoking during pregnancy, diabetes, obesity, older mother, certain medications
- Treatment: Surgery, speech therapy, dental care
- Prognosis: Good (with treatment)
- Frequency: 1.5 per 1000 births (developed world)
- Deaths: 3,800 (2017)

Cleft lip (orofacial cleft) is a medical condition where the upper lip has an opening from the perimeter of the mouth, that may extend into the nose. The opening may be on one side, both sides, or in the middle. Cleft palate is an associated condition where the palate (the roof of the mouth) has an opening into the nose. The term orofacial cleft refers to either condition or to both occurring together. These conditions can result in feeding problems, speech problems, hearing problems, and frequent ear infections. The condition may be associated with other disorders.

Cleft lip and palate are the result of tissues of the face not joining properly during development. As such, they are a type of birth defect. The cause is unknown in most cases. Risk factors include smoking during pregnancy, diabetes, obesity, an older mother, and certain medications (such as some used to treat seizures). Cleft lip and cleft palate can often be diagnosed during pregnancy with an ultrasound exam.

A cleft lip or palate can be successfully treated with surgery. This is often done in the first few months of life for cleft lip and before eighteen months for cleft palate. Speech therapy and dental care may also be needed. With appropriate treatment, outcomes are good.

Cleft lip and palate occurs in about 1 to 2 per 1000 births in the developed world. Cleft lip is about twice as common in males as females, while cleft palate without cleft lip is more common in females. In 2017, it resulted in about 3,800 deaths globally, down from 14,600 deaths in 1990. Cleft lips are commonly known as hare-lips because of their resemblance to the lips of hares or rabbits, although that term is considered to be offensive in certain contexts.

== Signs and symptoms ==
=== Cleft lip ===
If the cleft does not affect the palate structure of the mouth, it is referred to as cleft lip. Cleft lip is formed in the top of the lip as either a small gap or an indentation in the lip (partial or incomplete cleft), or it continues into the nose (complete cleft). Lip cleft can occur as a one-sided (unilateral) or two-sided (bilateral) condition. It is due to the failure of fusion of the maxillary prominence and medial nasal processes (formation of the primary palate).

Unilateral incomplete

Unilateral complete

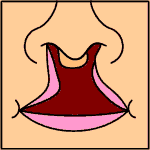
Bilateral complete

A mild form of a cleft lip is a microform cleft. A microform cleft can appear as small as a little dent in the red part of the lip or look like a scar from the lip up to the nostril. In some cases muscle tissue in the lip underneath the scar is affected and might require reconstructive surgery. It is advised to have newborn infants with a microform cleft checked with a craniofacial team as soon as possible to determine the severity of the cleft.

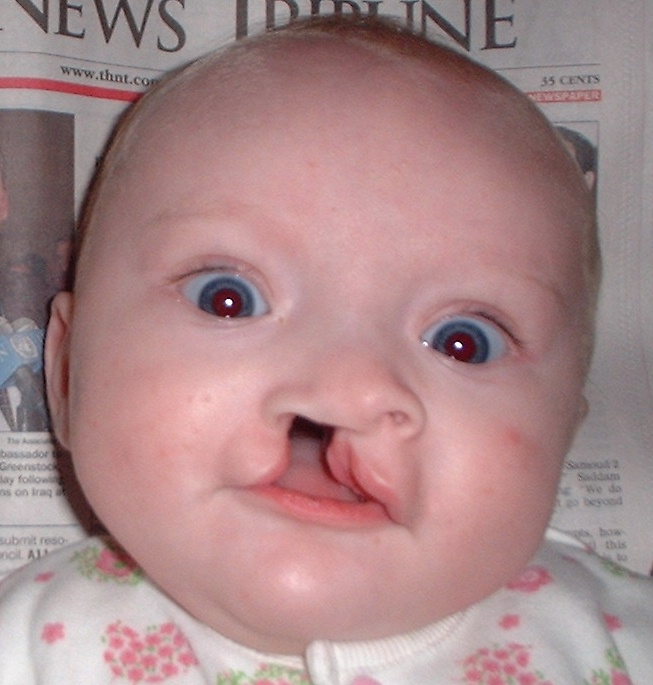
Six-month-old girl before going into surgery to have her unilateral complete cleft lip repaired

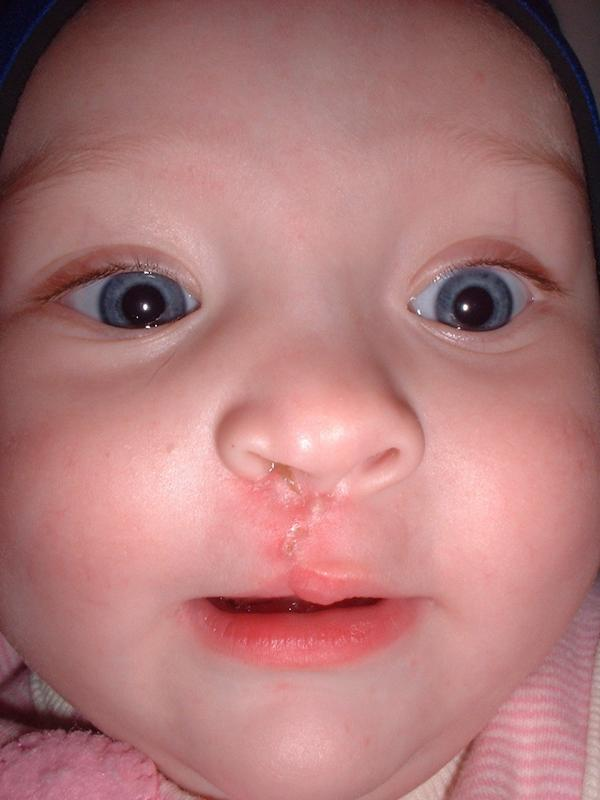
The same girl, one month after the surgery

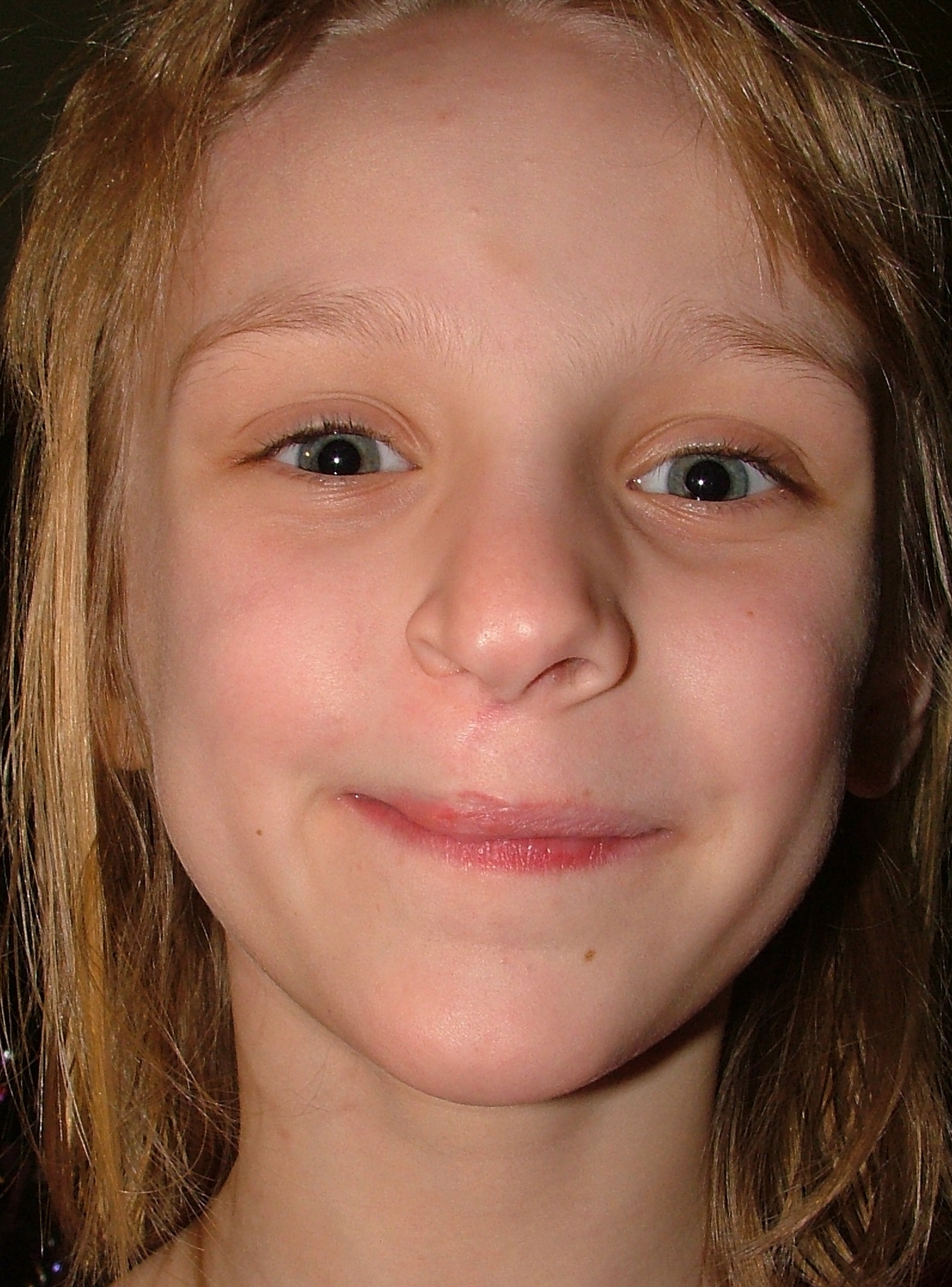
The same girl, age eight, the scar almost gone

=== Cleft palate ===
Cleft palate is a condition in which the two plates of the skull that form the hard palate (roof of the mouth) are not completely joined. The soft palate is in these cases cleft as well. In most cases, cleft lip is also present.

Palate cleft can occur as complete (soft and hard palate, possibly including a gap in the jaw) or incomplete (a 'hole' in the roof of the mouth, usually as a cleft soft palate). When cleft palate occurs, the uvula is usually split. It occurs due to the failure of fusion of the lateral palatine processes, the nasal septum, or the median palatine processes (formation of the secondary palate).

The hole in the roof of the mouth caused by a cleft connects the mouth directly to the inside of the nose.

Note: the next images show the roof of the mouth. The top shows the nose, the lips are colored pink. For clarity the images depict a toothless infant.

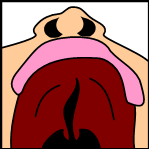
Incomplete cleft palate

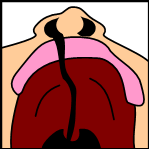
Unilateral complete lip and palate

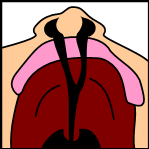
Bilateral complete lip and palate

A result of an open connection between the mouth and inside the nose is called velopharyngeal insufficiency (VPI). Because of the gap, air leaks into the nasal cavity resulting in a hypernasal voice resonance and nasal emissions while talking. Secondary effects of VPI include speech articulation errors (e.g., distortions, substitutions, and omissions) and compensatory misarticulations and mispronunciations (e.g., glottal stops and posterior nasal fricatives). Possible treatment options include speech therapy, prosthetics, augmentation of the posterior pharyngeal wall, lengthening of the palate, and surgical procedures.

Submucous cleft palate can also occur, which is a cleft of the soft palate with a split uvula, a furrow along the midline of the soft palate, and a notch in the back margin of the hard palate. The diagnosis of submucous cleft palate often occurs late in children as a result of the nature of the cleft. While the muscles of the soft palate are not joined, the mucosal membranes covering the roof of the mouth appear relatively normal and intact.

=== Teeth ===
Tooth development can be delayed with increasing severity of CLP. Some of the dental problems affect the primary teeth, but most of the problems arise after the permanent teeth erupt. Problems may include fused teeth, missing teeth, and extra teeth erupting behind normal teeth. Missing teeth or extra teeth are both normal occurrences. Typically, the lateral incisors are missing. The enamel (outermost layer of the tooth) is commonly found to be hypomineralized and hypoplastic, making the teeth more likely to decay. As CLP can make oral hygiene more difficult, there is an increased rate of cavities. In addition, abnormal positioning of individual teeth may affect occlusion, which can create an open bite or cross bite. This in turn can then affect the patient's speech.

=== Complications ===
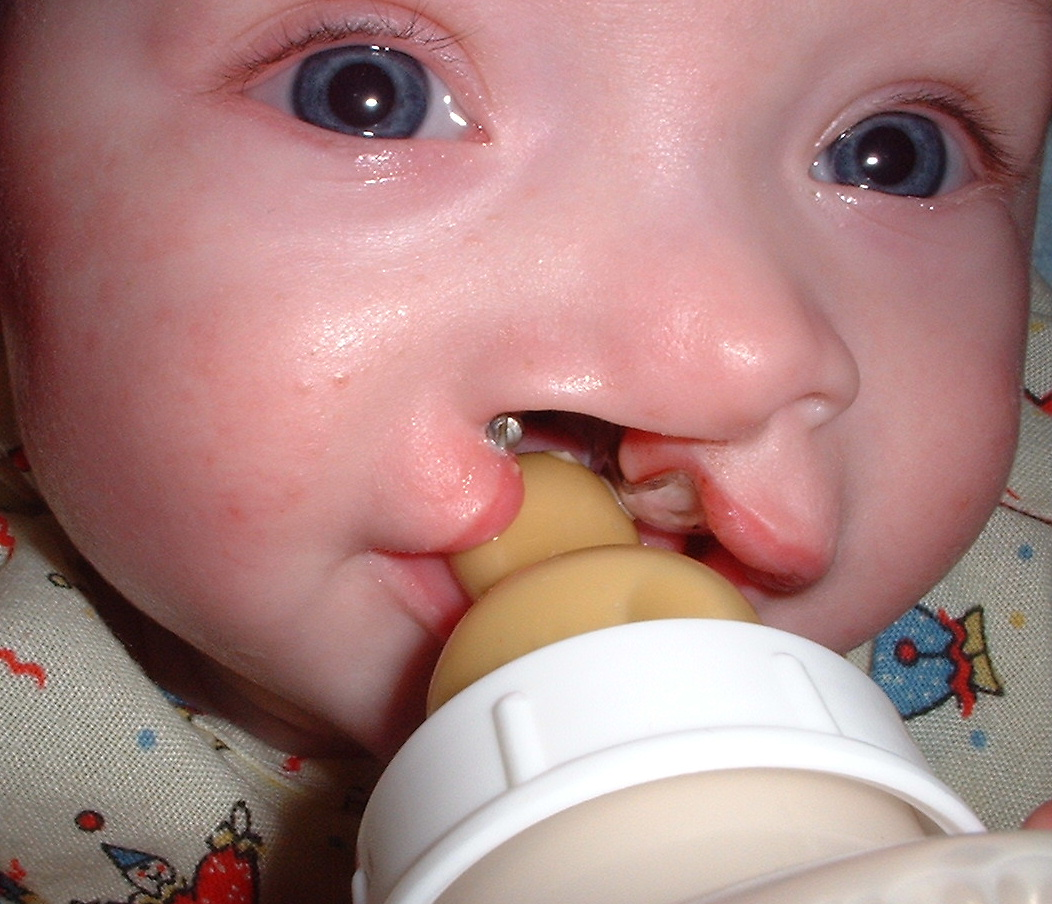
A baby being fed using a customized bottle. The upright sitting position allows gravity to help the baby swallow the milk more easily.

Cleft may cause problems with feeding, ear disease, speech, socialization, and cognition.

Due to lack of suction, an infant with a cleft may have trouble feeding. An infant with a cleft palate will have greater success feeding in a more upright position, as gravity will help prevent milk from coming through the baby's nose. Gravity feeding can be accomplished by using specialized equipment, such as the Haberman Feeder. Another equipment commonly used for gravity feeding is a customized bottle with a combination of nipples and bottle inserts. A large hole, crosscut, or slit in the nipple, a protruding nipple and rhythmically squeezing the bottle insert can result in controllable flow to the infant without the stigma caused by specialized equipment.

Individuals with cleft also face many middle ear infections which may eventually lead to hearing loss. The Eustachian tubes and external ear canals may be angled or tortuous, leading to food or other contamination of a part of the body that is normally self-cleaning. Hearing is related to learning to speak. Babies with palatal clefts may have compromised hearing and therefore, if the baby cannot hear, it cannot try to mimic the sounds of speech. Thus, even before expressive language acquisition, the baby with the cleft palate is at risk for receptive language acquisition. Because the lips and palate are both used in pronunciation, individuals with cleft usually need the aid of a speech therapist.

Tentative evidence has found that those with clefts perform less well at language.

=== Psychosocial issues ===
There is research dedicated to the psychosocial development of individuals with cleft palate. A cleft palate/lip may impact an individual's self-esteem, social skills and behavior. Self-concept may be adversely affected by the presence of a cleft lip or cleft palate, particularly among girls. Negative outcomes can also be associated with the long durations of hospitalization. Psychological issues could extend not just to the individual with CLP but also to their families, particularly their mothers, that experience varying levels of depression and anxiety.

Research has shown that during the early preschool years (ages 3–5), children with cleft lip or cleft palate tend to have a self-concept that is similar to their peers without a cleft. However, as they grow older and their social interactions increase, children with clefts tend to report more dissatisfaction with peer relationships and higher levels of social anxiety. Experts conclude that this is probably due to the associated stigma of visible deformities and possible speech impediments. Children who are judged as attractive tend to be perceived as more intelligent, exhibit more positive social behaviors, and are treated more positively than children with cleft lip or cleft palate. Children with clefts tend to report feelings of anger, sadness, fear, and alienation from their peers, but these children were similar to their peers in regard to "how well they liked themselves."

The relationship between parental attitudes and a child's self-concept is crucial during the preschool years. It has been reported that elevated stress levels in mothers correlated with reduced social skills in their children. Strong parent support networks may help to prevent the development of negative self-concept in children with cleft palate. In the later preschool and early elementary years, the development of social skills is no longer only impacted by parental attitudes but is beginning to be shaped by their peers. A cleft lip or cleft palate may affect the behavior of preschoolers. Experts suggest that parents discuss with their children ways to handle negative social situations related to their cleft lip or cleft palate. A child who is entering school should learn the proper (and age-appropriate) terms related to the cleft. The ability to confidently explain the condition to others may limit feelings of awkwardness and embarrassment and reduce negative social experiences.

As children reach adolescence, the period of time between age 13 and 19, the dynamics of the parent-child relationship change as peer groups are now the focus of attention. An adolescent with cleft lip or cleft palate will deal with the typical challenges faced by most of their peers including issues related to self-esteem, dating and social acceptance. Adolescents, however, view appearance as the most important characteristic, above intelligence and humor. This being the case, adolescents are susceptible to additional problems because they cannot hide their facial differences from their peers. Adolescent boys typically deal with issues relating to withdrawal, attention, thought, and internalizing problems, and may possibly develop anxiousness-depression and aggressive behaviors. Adolescent girls are more likely to develop problems relating to self-concept and appearance. Individuals with cleft lip or cleft palate often deal with threats to their quality of life for multiple reasons including unsuccessful social relationships, deviance in social appearance, and multiple surgeries.

== Cause ==
Most clefts are polygenic and multifactorial in origin with many genetic and environmental factors contributing. Genetic factors cause clefts in 20% to 50% of the cases and the remaining clefts are attributable to either environmental factors (such as teratogens) or gene-environment interactions. The polygenic/multifactorial inheritance model predicts that most individuals will be born without clefts; however with a number of genetic or environmental factors, it can result in cleft formation.

The development of the face is coordinated by complex morphogenetic events and rapid proliferative expansion, and is thus highly susceptible to environmental and genetic factors, rationalising the high incidence of facial malformations. During the first six to eight weeks of pregnancy, the shape of the embryo's head is formed. Five primitive tissue lobes grow:

- a) one from the top of the head down towards the future upper lip (frontonasal prominence);
- b-c) two from the cheeks, which meet the first lobe to form the upper lip (maxillar prominence);
- d-e) and just below, two additional lobes grow from each side, which form the chin and lower lip (mandibular prominence).

If these tissues fail to meet, a gap appears where the tissues should have joined (fused). This may happen in any single joining site, or simultaneously in several or all of them. The resulting birth defect reflects the locations and severity of individual fusion failures (e.g., from a small lip or palate fissure up to a completely malformed face).

The upper lip is formed earlier than the palate, from the first three lobes named a to c above. Formation of the palate is the last step in joining the five embryonic facial lobes, and involves the back portions of the lobes b and c. These back portions are called palatal shelves, which grow towards each other until they fuse in the middle. This process is very vulnerable to multiple toxic substances, environmental pollutants, and nutritional imbalance. The biologic mechanisms of mutual recognition of the two cabinets, and the way they are glued together, are quite complex and obscure despite intensive scientific research.

Orofacial clefts may be associated with a syndrome (syndromic) or may not be associated with a syndrome (nonsyndromic). Syndromic clefts are part of syndromes that are caused by a variety of factors such as environment and genetics or an unknown cause. Nonsyndromic clefts, which are not as common as syndromic clefts, also have a genetic cause.

=== Genetics ===
Genetic factors contributing to cleft lip and cleft palate formation have been identified for some syndromic cases. Many clefts run in families, even though in some cases there does not seem to be an identifiable syndrome present. A number of genes are involved including cleft lip and palate transmembrane protein 1 and GAD1. One study found an association between mutations in the HYAL2 gene and cleft lip and cleft palate formation.

==== Syndromes ====
- Van der Woude syndrome is caused by a specific variation in the gene IRF6 that increases the occurrence of these deformities threefold. Mutations in interferon regulatory factor 6 (IRF6) that cause cleft lip palate are also implicated in neural tube defects such as spina bifida.
- Another syndrome, Siderius X-linked intellectual disability, is caused by mutations in the PHF8 gene (OMIM: 300263); in addition to cleft lip or palate, symptoms include facial dysmorphism and mild intellectual disability.

In some cases, cleft palate is caused by syndromes that also cause other problems:

- Stickler syndrome can cause cleft lip and palate, joint pain, and myopia.
- Loeys–Dietz syndrome can cause cleft palate or bifid uvula, hypertelorism, and aortic aneurysm.
- Hardikar syndrome can cause cleft lip and palate, Hydronephrosis, Intestinal obstruction and other symptoms.
- Cleft lip/palate may be present in many different chromosome disorders including Patau syndrome (trisomy 13).
- Malpuech facial clefting syndrome
- Hearing loss with craniofacial syndromes
- Popliteal pterygium syndrome
- Cornelia de Lange syndrome
- Treacher Collins syndrome
- Pierre Robin syndrome

==== Specific genes ====
Type	OMIM	Gene	Locus
OFC1	119530	?	6p24
OFC2	602966	?	2p13
OFC3	600757	?	19q13
OFC4	608371	?	4q
OFC5	608874	MSX1	4p16.1
OFC6	608864	?	1q
OFC7	600644)	PVRL1	11q
OFC8	129400	TP63	3q27
OFC9	610361	?	13q33.1-q34
OFC10	601912	SUMO1	2q32.2-q33
OFC11	600625	BMP4	14q22
OFC12	612858	?	8q24.3

Many genes associated with syndromic cases of cleft lip/palate (see above) have been identified to contribute to the incidence of isolated cases of cleft lip/palate. This includes in particular sequence variants in the genes IRF6, PVRL1 and MSX1. The understanding of the genetic complexities involved in the morphogenesis of the midface, including molecular and cellular processes, has been greatly aided by research on animal models, including of the genes BMP4, SHH, SHOX2, FGF10 and MSX1.

=== Environmental factors ===
Environmental influences may also cause, or interact with genetics to produce, orofacial clefts. An example of the link between environmental factors and genetics comes from a research on mutations in the gene PHF8. The research found that PHF8 encodes for a histone lysine demethylase, and is involved in epigenetic regulation. The catalytic activity of PHF8 depends on molecular oxygen, a factor considered important from reports on increased incidence of cleft lip/palate in mice that have been exposed to hypoxia early during pregnancy.

Cleft lip and other congenital abnormalities have also been linked to maternal hypoxia caused by maternal smoking, with the estimated attributable fraction of orofacial clefts due to smoking in early pregnancy being 6.1%. Orofacial clefts occur very early in pregnancy and so smoking cessation right after recognition of pregnancy is unlikely to reduce the exposure during the critical time period.

Maternal alcohol use has also been linked to cleft lip and palate due to the effects on the cranial neural crest cells. The degree of the effect, however, is unknown and requires further research. Some forms of maternal hypertension treatment have been linked to cleft lip and palate. Other environmental factors that have been studied include seasonal causes (such as pesticide exposure); maternal diet and vitamin intake; retinoids (members of the vitamin A family); anticonvulsant drugs; nitrate compounds; organic solvents; parental exposure to lead; alcohol; cigarette use; and a number of other psychoactive drugs (e.g. cocaine, crack cocaine, heroin).

Current research continues to investigate the extent to which folic acid can reduce the incidence of clefting. Folic acid alone or in combination with vitamins and minerals prevents neural tube defects but does not have a clear effect on cleft lip palate incidence. The mechanism behind beneficial folate supplementation is due to folate playing a pivotal role in DNA synthesis and methylation and contributes to both development and gene expression.

== Diagnosis ==
Traditionally, the diagnosis is made at the time of birth by physical examination. Recent advances in prenatal diagnosis have allowed obstetricians to diagnose facial clefts in utero with ultrasonography.

Clefts can also affect other parts of the face, such as the eyes, ears, nose, cheeks, and forehead. In 1976, Paul Tessier described fifteen lines of cleft. Most of these craniofacial clefts are even rarer and are frequently described as Tessier clefts using the numerical locator devised by Tessier.

=== Classification ===
Cleft lip and cleft palate is an "umbrella term" for a collection of orofacial clefts. It includes clefting of the upper lip, the maxillary alveolus (dental arch), and the hard or soft palate, in various combinations. Proposed anatomic combinations include:

- cleft lip
- cleft lip and alveolus
- cleft lip, alveolus, and palate
- cleft lip and palate (with an intact alveolus)
- cleft palate

=== Prenatal diagnosis ===
Cleft lip with or without palate is classified as the most common congenital birth defect. It has been noted that the prevalence of orofacial clefts varies by race. The highest number of cases have been recorded among Asians and Native Americans, followed by Europeans, Hispanics and African-Americans. The critical period for cleft development ranges from the 4th to the 12th week of intrauterine life. Clefts of the primary palate develop between the 4th and 7th weeks of intrauterine life, while clefts of the secondary palate develop between the 8th and 12th embryonic weeks.

Accurate evaluation of craniofacial malformations is usually possible with the ultrasound scan performed during pregnancy. This is however not a routine procedure according to the American Institute of Ultrasound in Medicine. The accuracy of ultrasonography for prenatal diagnosis of cleft lip +/- palate is dependent on the experience of the sonologist, maternal body type, foetal position, the amount of amniotic fluid and the type of cleft.

Prenatal diagnosis enables appropriate and timely education and discussion with parents by the cleft team. This helps improve the quality of treatment received by the child and improves quality of life.

An accurate prenatal diagnosis of the CLP anomaly is critical for establishing long-term treatment planning, prediction of treatment outcome, and discussion and education of the parent. Although there is no intrauterine treatment for CLP, both mother and child benefit from early diagnosis and education. A multidisciplinary team approach is now accepted as the standard of care in dealing with CLP patients.

The time period immediately after the diagnosis and the first year after the birth is most challenging for parents. A systematically planned treatment plan and support system will help assist parents. The ultimate aim is to help educate parents and create awareness so as to improve care provided for the child.

== Treatment ==
Cleft lip and palate is very treatable; however, the kind of treatment depends on the type and severity of the cleft.

Most children with a form of clefting are monitored by a cleft palate team or craniofacial team through young adulthood. Care can be lifelong and are looked after by craniofacial cleft teams often consist of: cleft surgeons, orthodontists, speech and language therapists, restorative dentists, psychologists, ENT surgeons and audio-logical physicians. Treatment procedures can vary between craniofacial teams. For example, some teams wait on jaw correction until the child is aged 10 to 12 (argument: growth is less influential as deciduous teeth are replaced by permanent teeth, thus saving the child from repeated corrective surgeries), while other teams correct the jaw earlier (argument: less speech therapy is needed than at a later age when speech therapy becomes harder). Within teams, treatment can differ between individual cases depending on the type and severity of the cleft.

=== Cleft lip ===
Within the first 2–3 months after birth, surgery is performed to close the cleft lip. While surgery to repair a cleft lip can be performed soon after birth, often the preferred age is at approximately 10 weeks of age, following the "rule of 10s" coined by surgeons Wilhelmmesen and Musgrave in 1969 (the child is at least 10 weeks of age; weighs at least 10 pounds (4.5 kg), and has at least 10g/dL hemoglobin). If the cleft is bilateral and extensive, two surgeries may be required to close the cleft, one side first, and the second side a few weeks later. The most common procedure to repair a cleft lip is the Millard procedure pioneered by Ralph Millard. Millard performed the first procedure at a Mobile Army Surgical Hospital (MASH) unit in Korea.

Often an incomplete cleft lip requires the same surgery as complete cleft. This is done for two reasons. Firstly the group of muscles required to purse the lips run through the upper lip. To restore the complete group a full incision must be made. Secondly, to create a less obvious scar the surgeon tries to line up the scar with the natural lines in the upper lip (such as the edges of the philtrum) and tuck away stitches as far up the nose as possible. Incomplete cleft gives the surgeon more tissue to work with, creating a more supple and natural-looking upper lip.

The blue lines indicate incisions.

Movement of the flaps; flap A is moved between B and C. C is rotated slightly while B is pushed down.

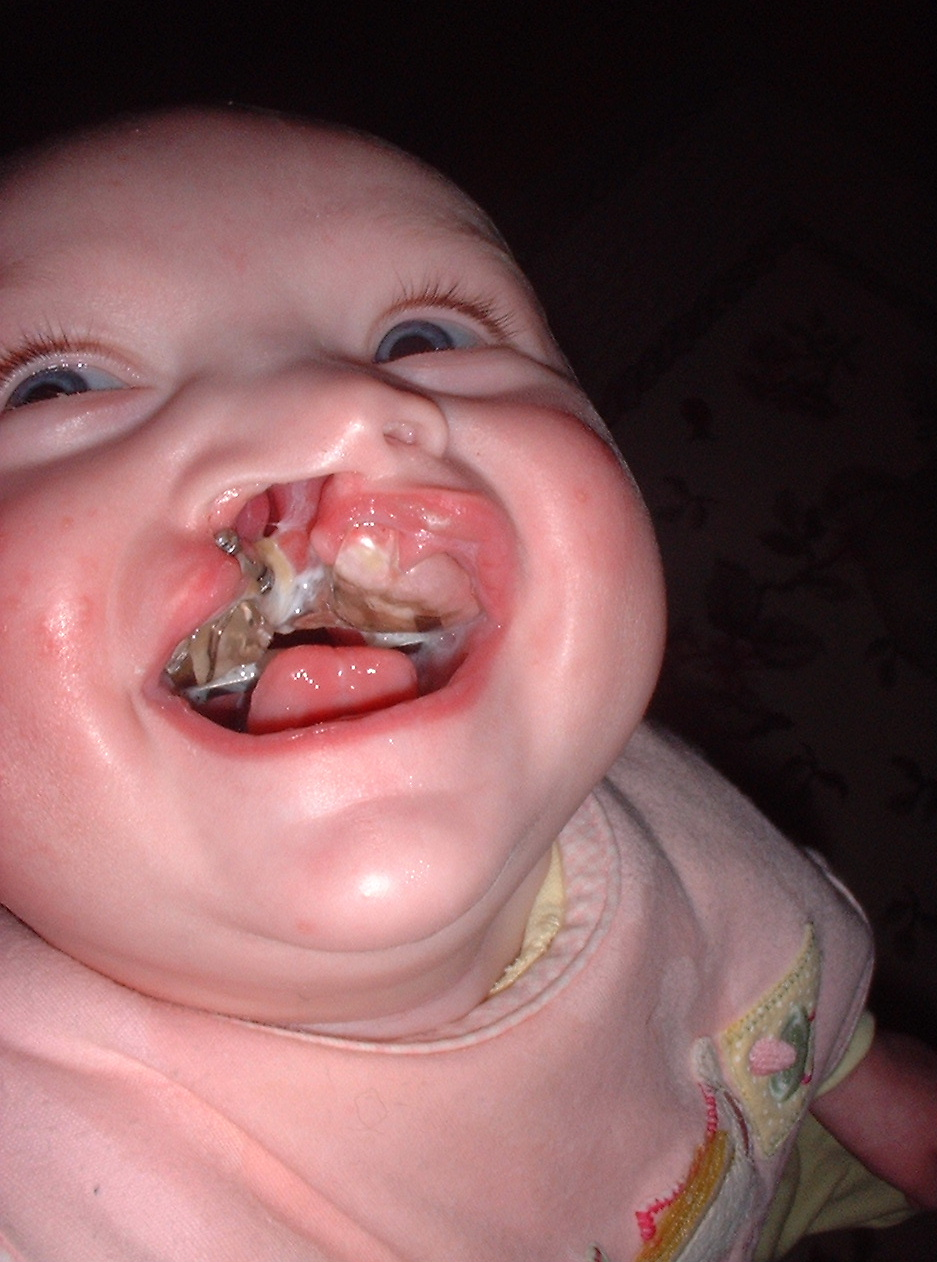
Pre-operation

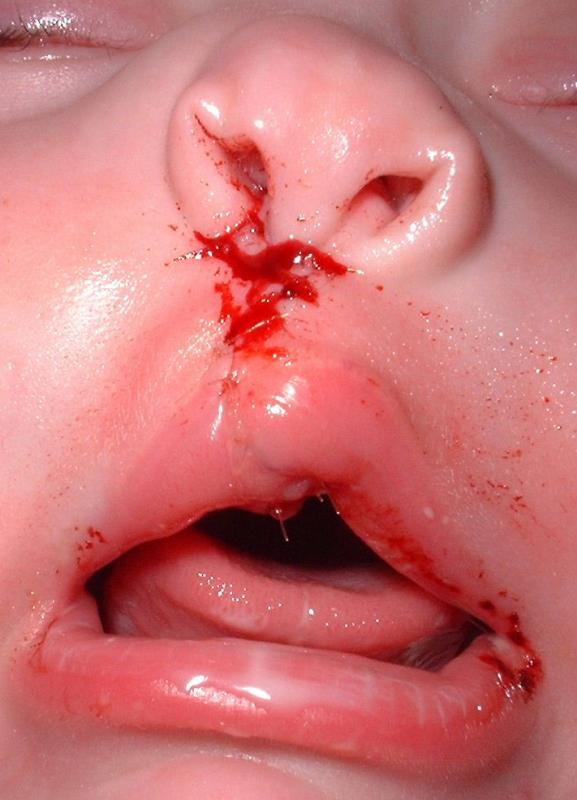
Post-operation, the lip is swollen from surgery and will look more natural within weeks. See photos in the section above.

==== Pre-surgical devices ====
In some cases of a severe bilateral complete cleft, the premaxillary segment will be protruded far outside the mouth.

Nasoalveolar molding prior to surgery can improve long-term nasal symmetry where there is complete unilateral cleft lip–cleft palate, compared to correction by surgery alone, according to a retrospective cohort study. In this study, significant improvements in nasal symmetry were observed in multiple areas including measurements of the projected length of the nasal ala (lateral surface of the external nose), position of the superoinferior alar groove, position of the mediolateral nasal dome, and nasal bridge deviation. "The nasal ala projection length demonstrated an average ratio of 93.0 percent in the surgery-alone group and 96.5 percent in the nasoalveolar molding group," this study concluded. A systematic review found in conclusion that nasoalveolar molding had a positive effect on the primary surgery of cleft lip/or palate treatment and aesthetics.

=== Cleft palate ===
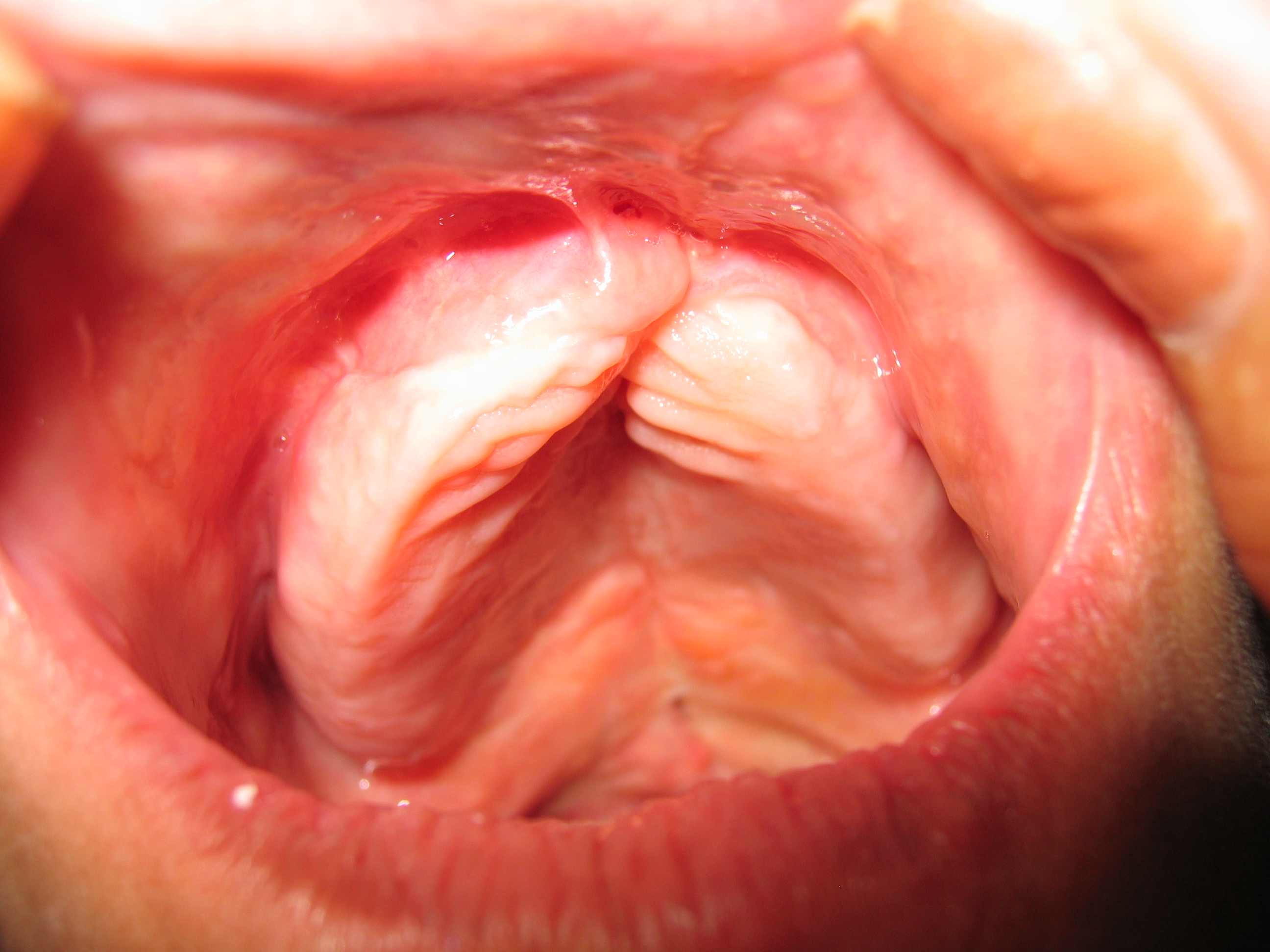
A repaired cleft palate on a 64-year-old female

Often a cleft palate is temporarily covered by a palatal obturator (a prosthetic device made to fit the roof of the mouth covering the gap). This device re-positions displaced alveolar segments and helps reduce the cleft lip separation. The obturator will improve speech as there's now proper airflow and improve feeding and breathing as the gap in the hard and soft palate is closed over so cannot affect it.

Cleft palate can also be corrected by surgery, usually performed between 6 and 12 months. Approximately 20–25% only require one palatal surgery to achieve a competent velopharyngeal valve capable of producing normal, non-hypernasal speech. However, combinations of surgical methods and repeated surgeries are often necessary as the child grows. One of the new innovations of cleft lip and cleft palate repair is the Latham appliance. The Latham is surgically inserted by use of pins during the child's fourth or fifth month. After it is in place, the doctor, or parents, turn a screw daily to bring the cleft together to assist with future lip or palate repair.

If the cleft extends into the maxillary alveolar ridge, the gap is usually corrected by filling the gap with bone tissue. The bone tissue can be acquired from the individual's own chin, rib or hip.

At age 1–7 years the child is regularly reviewed by the cleft team.

Age 7–12 years, for the children born with alveolar clefts, they may need to have a secondary alveolar bone graft. This is where autogenous cancellous bone from a donor site (often the pelvic bone) is transplanted into the alveolar cleft region. This transplant of bone will close the osseous cleft of the alveolus, close any oro-nasal fistulae and will become integrated with the maxillary bone. It provides bone for teeth to erupt into and to allow implants to be placed as a possible future treatment option. The procedure should be carried out before the upper canine has erupted. Ideally the root of the canine should be one to two-thirds formed and that there is a space available to place the bone graft. Radio-graphs are taken to determine the quantity of missing bone in the cleft area.

==== Other surgeries ====
Orthognathic surgery – surgical cutting of bone to realign the upper jaw (osteotomy). The bone is cut then re-positioned and held together by wires or rigid fixation plates to ensure there's no anterior-posterior discrepancy, also to reduce scarring as it reduces growth. Single piece or multi-piece osteotomy exist. Single piece osteotomy is carried out where there is sufficient alveolar continuity achieved from a successful bone graft. Multi piece osteotomy is performed when there is a notable residual alveolar defect with a dental gap and oronasal fistula (communication between the oral and nasal cavities). The goal of both single and multi piece osteotomy is to displace the maxilla forward to obtain adequate occlusion as well to provide better support for upper lip and the nose and to close any fistulae.

Distraction osteogenesis – bone lengthening by gradual distraction. This involves cutting bone and moving ends apart incrementally to allow new bone to form in the gap. This consists of several phases. After attachment of the distracting device and the bone cuts, there is a latency phase of 3–7 days when a callus forms. In the activation phase distraction of the callus induces bony ingrowth which can last up to 15 days depending on the required distraction. Once the required bone length is reached, the distraction device is left to remain in situ as it acts as a rigid skeletal fixation device until the new bone has matured (known as the consolidation period).

=== Speech ===
Velopharyngeal insufficiency (VPI) can occur as a result of an unrepaired or repaired cleft lip and palate. VPI is the inability of the soft palate to close tightly against the back of the throat during speech, resulting in incomplete velopharyngeal closure. In turn, this results in speech abnormalities. Velopharyngeal closure is necessary during speech because it forms a seal between the nose and mouth, allowing the production of normal speech sounds. VPI can cause hypernasality (excessive nasal resonance), hyponasality (reduced nasal resonance), or a mixed nasal resonance, which is when hypernasality and hyponasality occur simultaneously. In addition, CLP may cause abnormal positioning of individual teeth, which can in turn affect the patient's ability to make certain sounds when speaking such as the "f" or "v" sound and can also result in a lisp. The changes in speech may also be a manifestation on CLP's effects on the patient's occlusion.

=== Hearing ===
Children with cleft palate have a very high risk of developing a middle ear infection, specifically otitis media. This is due to the immature development of the different bones and muscles in the ear. Otitis media is caused by the obstruction of the Eustachian tube, negative middle ear pressure and fluid build-up in the normally air-filled space of the middle ear. This is associated with hearing impairment or loss. The insertion of a ventilation tube into the eardrum is a surgical treatment option commonly used to improve hearing in children with otitis media. In addition, breast milk has been proven to decrease the incidence of otitis media in infants with clefts.

=== Feeding ===
There are different options on how to feed a baby with cleft lip or cleft palate, including breast-feeding, bottle feeding, spoon feeding, and syringe feeding. Although breast-feeding is challenging, it improves weight-gain compared to spoon-feeding. Nasal regurgitation is common due to the open space between the oral cavity and the nasal cavity. Bottle feeding can help (with squeezable bottles being easier to use than rigid bottles). In addition, maxillary plates can be added to aid in feeding. Whatever feeding method is established, it is important to keep the baby's weight gain and hydration monitored. Infants with cleft lip or palate may require supplemental feeds for adequate growth and nutrition. Breast feeding position as suggested by specialists can also improve success rate.

==== Breast-feeding ====
Babies with cleft lip are more likely to breastfeed successfully than those with cleft palate and cleft lip and palate. Larger clefts of the soft or hard palate may not be able to generate suction as the oral cavity cannot be separated from the nasal cavity when feeding which leads to fatigue, prolonged feeding time, impaired growth and nutrition. Changes in swallowing mechanics may result in coughing, choking, gagging and nasal regurgitation. Even after cleft repair, the problem may still persist as significant motor learning of swallowing and sucking was absent for many months before repair. These difficulties in feeding may result in secondary problems such as poor weight gain, excessive energy expenditure during feeding, lengthy feeding times, discomfort during feeding, and stressful feeding interactions between the infant and the mother. A potential source of discomfort for the baby during or after feeding is bloating or frequent "spit up" which is due to the excessive air intake through the nose and mouth in the open cleft.

Advice to mothers regarding the breastfeeding or otherwise of babies with cleft lip and or palate should be individually evaluated taking into account the size and location of the cleft and the mother's previous experience with breastfeeding.

Another option is feeding breast milk via bottle or syringe. Since babies with clip lip and cleft palate generate less suction when breastfeeding, their nutrition, hydration and weight gain may be affected. This may result in the need for supplemental feeds. Modifying the position of holding the baby may increase the effectiveness and efficiency of breastfeeding.

==== Alternative feeding methods ====
Preoperative feeding – using a squeezable bottle instead of a rigid bottle can allow a higher volume of food intake and less effort to extract food. Using a syringe is practical, easy to perform and allows greater administered volume of food. It also means there will be weight gain and less time spent feeding.

Post-operative feeding (isolated lip repair, or lip repair associated or not with palatoplasty) – post palatoplasty, some studies believe that inappropriate negative pressure on the suture line may affect results. Babies can be fed by a nasogastric tube instead. Studies suggest babies required less analgesics and shorter hospital stay with nasogastric feeding post-surgery. With bottle-feeding, there was higher feeding rejection and pain and required more frequent and prolonged feeding times.

=== Treatment schedule ===
Each person's treatment schedule is individualized. The table below shows a common sample treatment schedule. The colored squares indicate the average timeframe in which the indicated procedure occurs. In some cases, this is usually one procedure, for example lip repair. In other cases, it is an ongoing therapy, for example speech therapy. In most cases of cleft lip and palate that involve the alveolar bone, patients will need a treatment plan including the prevention of cavities, orthodontics, alveolar bone grafting, and possibly jaw surgery.

Age	0m	3m	6m	9m	1y	2y	3y	4y	5y	6y	7y	8y	9y	10y	11y	12y	13y	14y	15y	16y	17y	18y
Palatal obturator																						
Repair cleft lip																						
Repair soft palate																						
Repair hard palate																						
Tympanostomy tube																						
Speech therapy/pharyngoplasty																						
Alveolar cleft grafting																						
Orthodontics																						
Orthognathic surgery																						

=== Cleft team ===
People with CLP present with a multiplicity of problems. Therefore, effective management of CLP involves a wide range of specialists. The current model for delivery of this care is the multidisciplinary cleft team. This is a group of individuals from different specialist backgrounds who work closely together to provide patients with comprehensive care from birth through adolescence. This system of delivery of care enables the individuals within the team to function in an interdisciplinary way, so that all aspects of care for CLP patients can be provided in the best way possible.

=== Outcomes assessment ===
Measuring the outcomes of CLP treatment has been laden with difficulty due to the complexity and longitudinal nature of cleft care, which spans birth through young adulthood. Prior attempts to study the effectiveness of specific interventions or overall treatment protocols have been hindered by a lack of data standards for outcomes assessment in cleft care.

The International Consortium for Health Outcome Measurement (ICHOM) has proposed the Standard Set of Outcome Measures for Cleft Lip and Palate. The ICHOM Standard Set includes measures for many of the important outcome domains in cleft care (hearing, breathing, eating/drinking, speech, oral health, appearance and psychosocial well-being). It includes clinician-reported, patient-reported, and family-reported outcome measures.

== Epidemiology ==
Cleft lip and palate occurs in about 1 to 2 per 1000 births in the developed world.

Rates for cleft lip with or without cleft palate and cleft palate alone varies within different ethnic groups.

According to CDC, the prevalence of cleft palate in the United States is 6.35/10000 births and the prevalence of cleft lip with or without cleft palate is 10.63/10000 births. The highest prevalence rates for cleft lip, either with or without cleft palate are reported for Native Americans and Asians. Africans have the lowest prevalence rates.

- Native Americans: 3.74/1000
- Japanese: 0.82/1000 to 3.36/1000
- Chinese: 1.45/1000 to 4.04/1000
- White Americans: 1.43/1000 to 1.86/1000
- Latin Americans: 1.04/1000
- Africans: 0.18/1000 to 1.67/1000

Cleft lip and cleft palate caused about 3,800 deaths globally in 2017, down from 14,600 deaths in 1990.

Prevalence of "cleft uvula" has varied from 0.02% to 18.8% with the highest numbers found among Chippewa and Navajo and the lowest generally in Africans.

In 2025, the American Cleft Palate-Craniofacial Association (ACPA) put out an official statement related to epidemiology of cleft lip/palate in the United States:

APCA has long cited statistics of cleft prevalence as 7,000 children born in the United States each year, or 1 in 600 births. Several agencies collect this type of data, most notably the National Birth Defects Prevention Network (NBDPN). ... Even as global numbers vary in reported data, ACPA sought updated U.S.-specific data to provide a clearer understanding of U.S. prevalence. In 2023, data were compiled from reported state-specific departments of health for the years 2016-2020, and NBDPN published updated numbers in their birth defects reports. No other update had been provided since the release of 2014 data. Therefore, ACPA recommends that healthcare and patient-advocacy organizations adopt the following statement regarding cleft prevalence in the United States:

"Between 6,000 and 8,000 children are born yearly in the United States with a cleft lip and/or palate. In the United States, about 1 in 1,050 babies is born with cleft lip with or without cleft palate, and about 1 in 1,600 babies is born with cleft palate alone."

The CDC corroborates these new statistics and has updated its main cleft lip/palate web site, accordingly.

== Society and culture ==
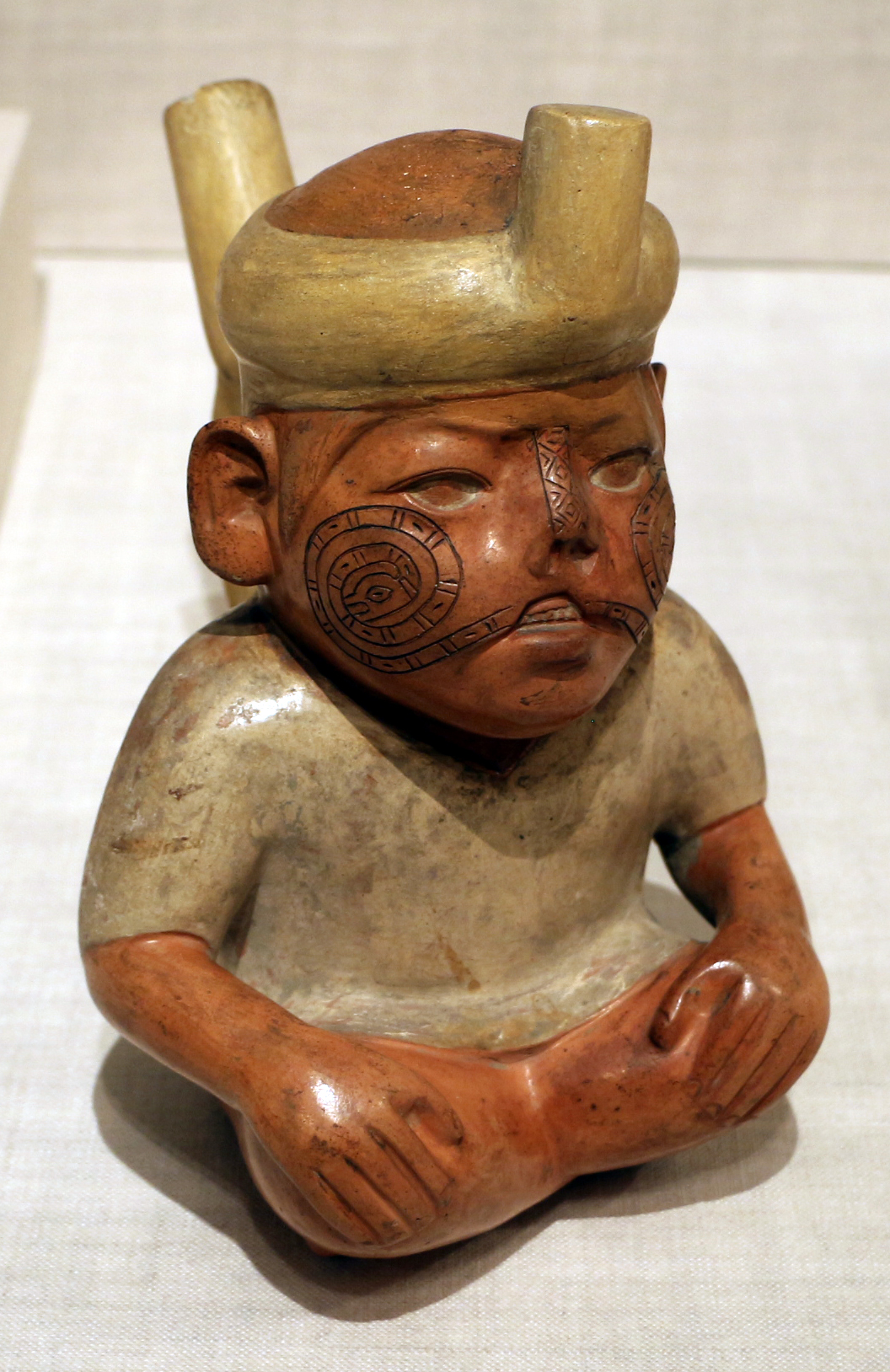
Moche pottery

=== Handicap law and abortion controversies ===
In some countries, cleft lip or palate deformities are considered reasons (either generally tolerated or officially sanctioned) to perform an abortion beyond the legal fetal age limit, even though the fetus is not in jeopardy of life or limb. Some political opponents contend this practice amounts to eugenics based on cosmetic defects rather than practical definitions of a disability.

=== Works of fiction ===
The eponymous hero of J. M. Coetzee's 1983 novel Life & Times of Michael K has a cleft lip that is never corrected. In the 1920 novel Growth of the Soil, by Norwegian writer Knut Hamsun, Inger (wife of the main character) has an uncorrected cleft lip which puts heavy limitations on her life, even causing her to kill her own child, who is also born with a cleft lip. The protagonist of the 1924 novel Precious Bane, by English writer Mary Webb, is a young woman living in 19th-century rural Shropshire who eventually comes to feel that her deformity is the source of her spiritual strength. The book was later adapted for television by both the BBC and ORTF in France. Similarly, the main character in Graham Greene's 1936 crime noir novel A Gun for Sale, Raven, has a cleft lip which he is sensitive about, and is described as "an ugly man dedicated to ugly deeds". In the 1976 Patricia A. McKillip novel The Night Gift, one of the high-school aged protagonists is shy because she has a cleft lip, but learns to have more confidence in herself.

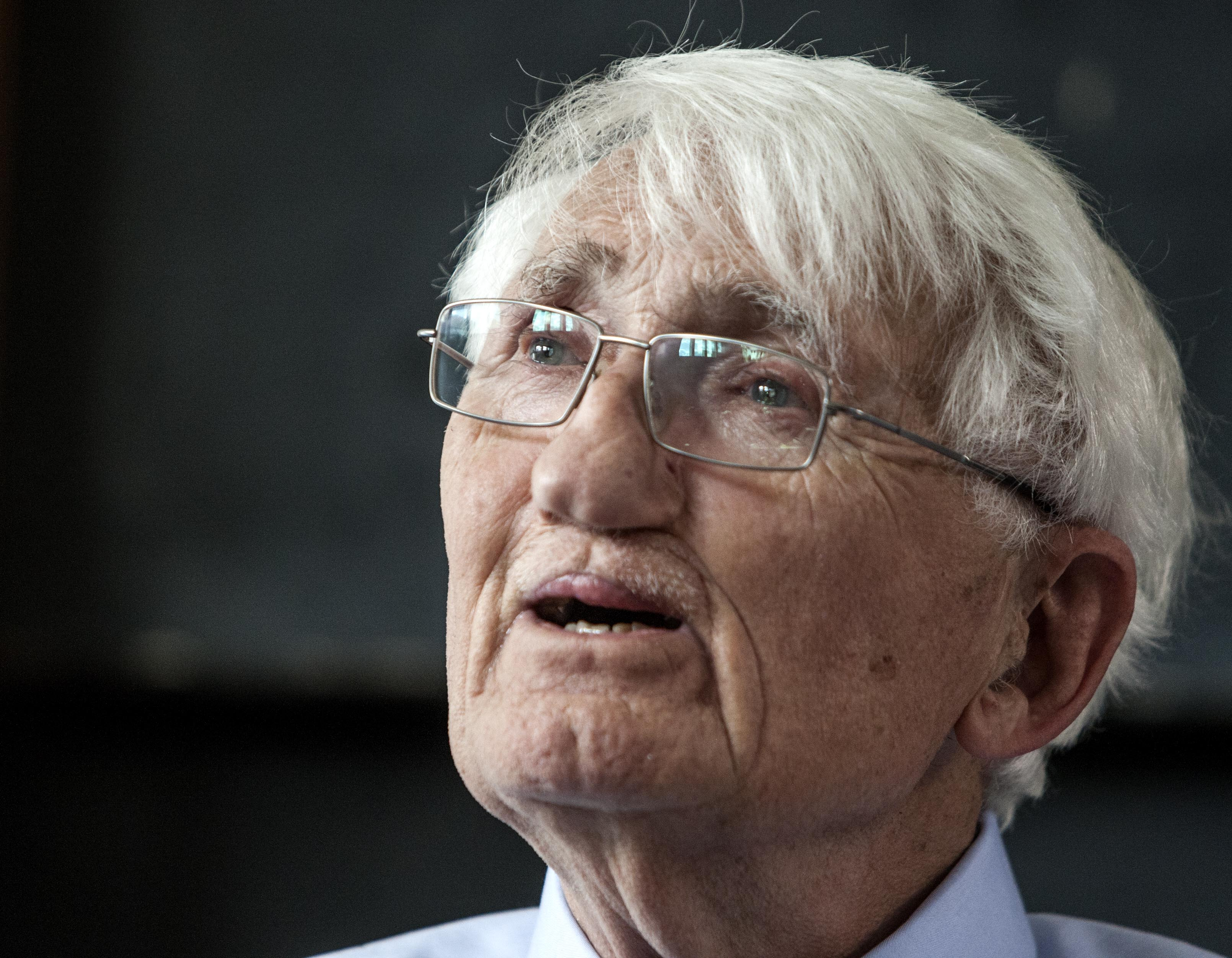
Philosopher Jürgen Habermas, who said that his cleft palate left him with a greater sensitivity to "the medium of linguistic communication without which individual existence would also be impossible."

In the first edition of Harry Potter and the Chamber of Secrets, one of the people Gilderoy Lockhart stole credit from was a witch with a harelip who banished the Bandon Banshee. In later editions, this was changed to a witch with a hairy chin.

In chapter 26 of Mark Twain's The Adventures of Huckleberry Finn, Huck Finn meets the three Wilks sisters, Mary Jane, Susan, and Joanna. Joanna is described as, "the one who gives herself to good works and has a hare-lip." As a form of offensive synecdoche, Huck Finn refers to Joanna as "the hare-lip" rather than by her name.

Cleft lip and cleft palate are often portrayed negatively in popular culture. Examples include Oddjob, the secondary villain of the James Bond novel Goldfinger by Ian Fleming (the film adaptation does not mention this but leaves it implied) and serial killer Francis Dolarhyde in the novel Red Dragon and its screen adaptations, Manhunter, Red Dragon, and Hannibal. The portrayal of enemy characters with cleft lips and cleft palates, dubbed mutants, in the 2019 video game Rage 2 left Chris Plante of Polygon wondering if the condition would ever be portrayed positively.

=== Notable cases ===
Name	Comments
Jerry Byrd	American sportswriter for the Shreveport Journal, 1957–1991, and Bossier Press-Tribune, 1993–2012; born with cleft lip and without cleft palate
John Henry "Doc" Holliday	American dentist, gambler and gunfighter of the American Old West, who is usually remembered for his friendship with Wyatt Earp and the Gunfight at the O.K. Corral
Tutankhamen	Egyptian pharaoh who may have had a slightly cleft palate according to diagnostic imaging
Thorgils Skarthi	Thorgils 'the hare-lipped'—a 10th-century Viking warrior and founder of Scarborough, England.
Tad Lincoln	Fourth and youngest son of President Abraham Lincoln
Carmit Bachar	American dancer and singer
Jürgen Habermas	German philosopher and sociologist
Ljubo Milicevic	Australian professional footballer
Stacy Keach	American actor and narrator
Cheech Marin	American actor and comedian
Owen Schmitt	American football fullback
Tim Lott	English author and journalist
Richard Hawley	English musician
Dario Šarić	Croatian professional basketball player
Antoinette Bourignon	Flemish mystic
Tom Burke	English actor
Franz Rogowski	German actor
Aditya Chopra	Film director Producer Screen writer Studio executive
Angelo Stiller	German footballer

== Other animals ==
Cleft lips and palates are occasionally seen in cattle and dogs, and rarely in goats, sheep, cats, horses, pandas and ferrets. Most commonly, the defect involves the lip, rhinarium, and premaxilla. Clefts of the hard and soft palate are sometimes seen with a cleft lip. The cause is usually hereditary. Brachycephalic dogs such as Boxers and Boston Terriers are most commonly affected. An inherited disorder with incomplete penetrance has also been suggested in Shih Tzus, Swiss Sheepdogs, Bulldogs, and Pointers. In horses, it is a rare condition usually involving the caudal soft palate. In Charolais cattle, clefts are seen in combination with arthrogryposis, which is inherited as an autosomal recessive trait. It is also inherited as an autosomal recessive trait in Texel sheep. Other contributing factors may include maternal nutritional deficiencies, exposure in utero to viral infections, trauma, drugs, or chemicals, or ingestion of toxins by the mother, such as certain lupines by cattle during the second or third month of gestation. The use of corticosteroids during pregnancy in dogs and the ingestion of Veratrum californicum by pregnant sheep have also been associated with cleft formation.

Difficulty with nursing is the most common problem associated with clefts, but aspiration pneumonia, regurgitation, and malnutrition are often seen with cleft palate and is a common cause of death. Providing nutrition through a feeding tube is often necessary, but corrective surgery in dogs can be done by the age of twelve weeks. For cleft palate, there is a high rate of surgical failure resulting in repeated surgeries. Surgical techniques for cleft palate in dogs include prosthesis, mucosal flaps, and microvascular free flaps. Affected animals should not be bred due to the hereditary nature of this condition.

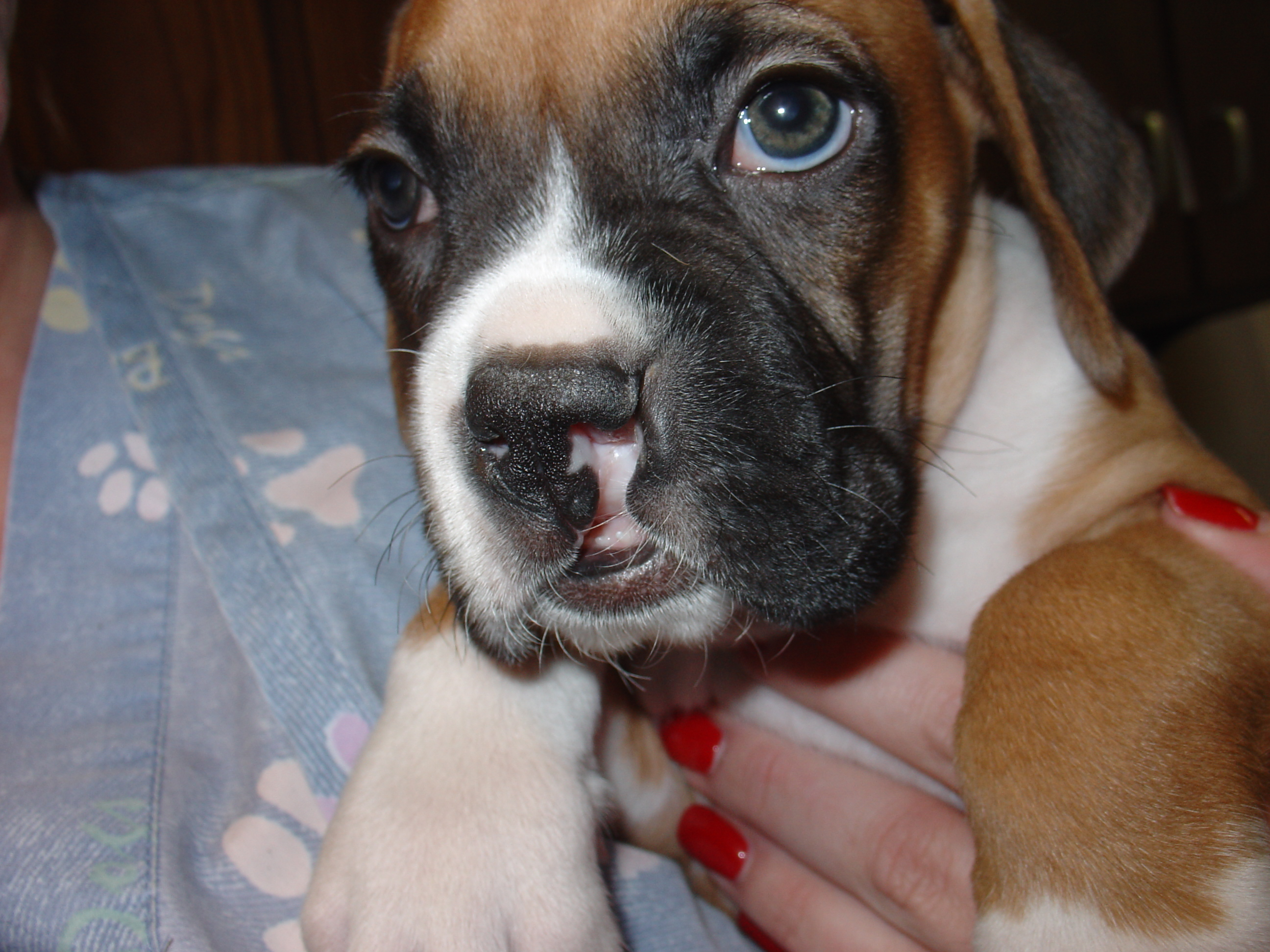
Cleft lip in a Boxer

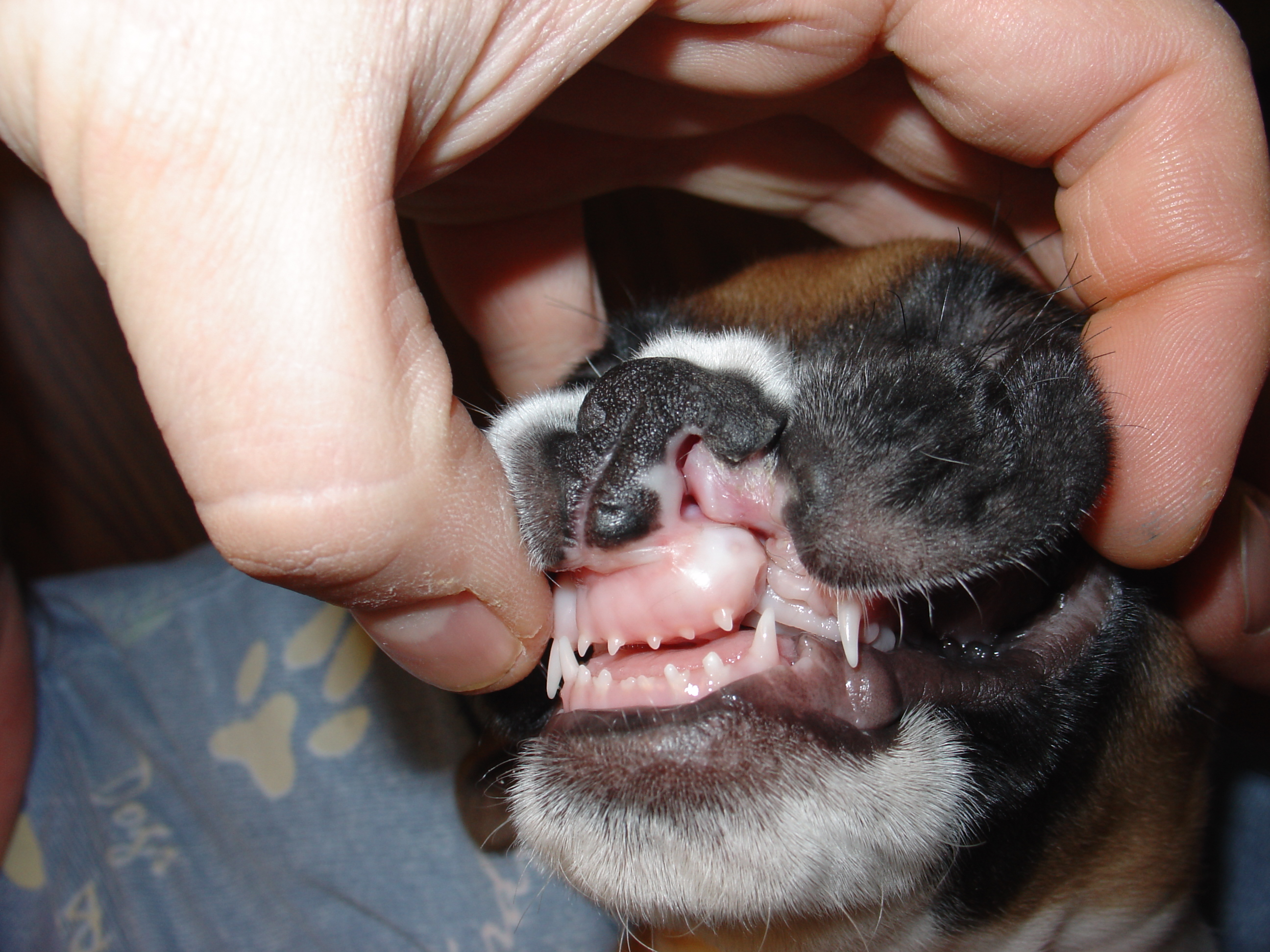
Cleft lip in a Boxer with premaxillary involvement

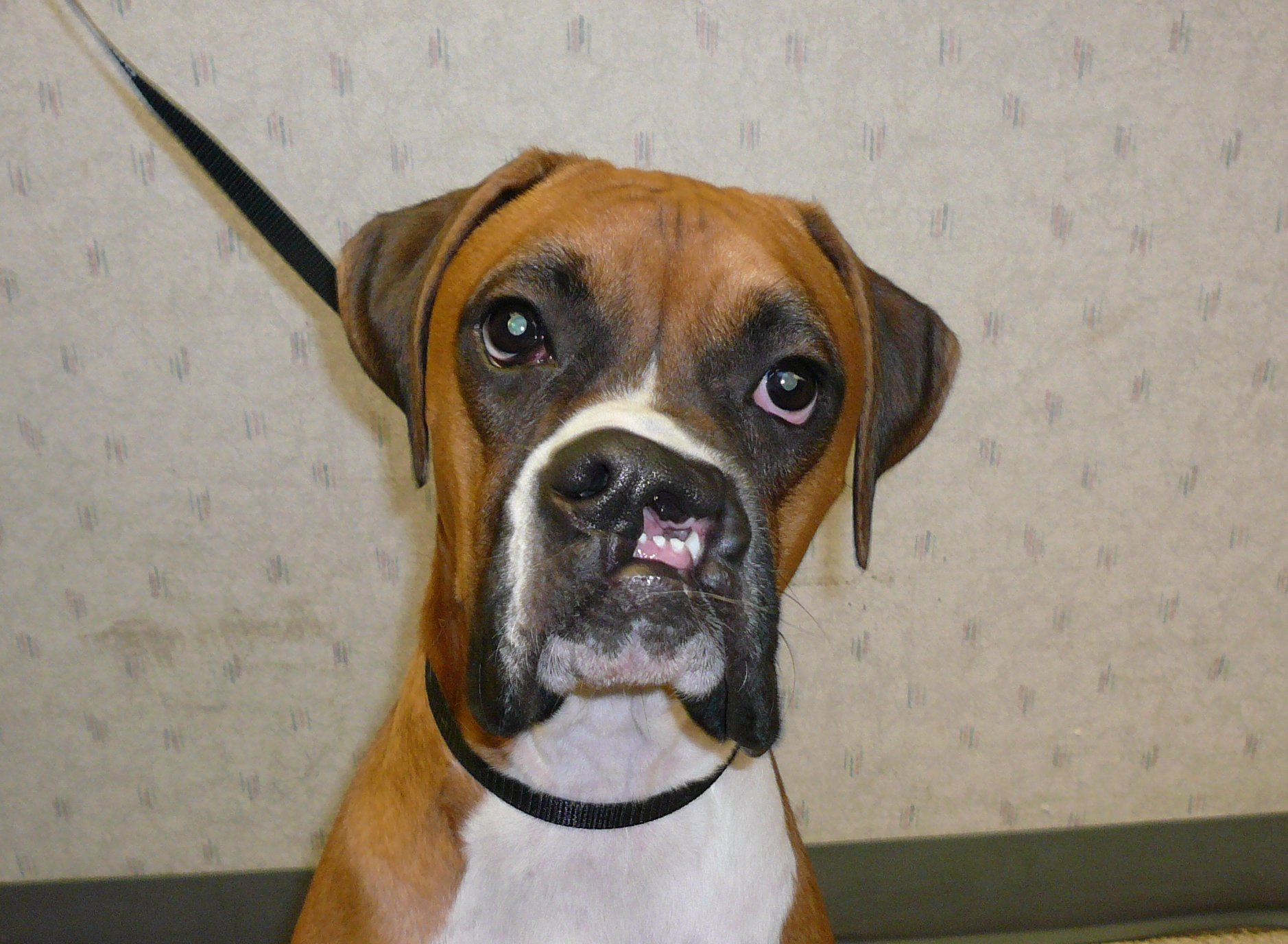
Same dog as picture on left, one year later

== See also ==
- Smile Pinki
- Palatal obturator
- Vomer flap surgery
- Cleft lip and palate organisations
- Face and neck development of the embryo
