= General Schneider =

General Schneider may refer to:

- Antoine Virgile Schneider (1779–1847), French Army lieutenant general
- Erich Schneider (1894–1980), German Wehrmacht lieutenant general
- Kevin Schneider (fl. 1980s–2020s), U.S. Air Force lieutenant general
- Merlin F. Schneider (1901–1970), U.S. Marine Corps brigadier general
- René Schneider (1913–1970), Chilean Army general
- William H. Schneider (1934–1994), U.S. Army lieutenant general

== See also ==
- Attorney General Schneider (disambiguation)
- General Snyder (disambiguation)
