= Ohio State University College of Dentistry =

Dental school in Columbus, Ohio, US

- Type: Public
- Established: 1914
- Dean: Carroll Ann Trotman, BDS, MA, MS effective August 15, 2021.
- Academic staff: 662 (incl staff)
- Students: Typical size of DDS entering class: 120; Typical size of Dental Hygiene class: 35
- Location: Columbus, Ohio, United States; 39°59′46″N 83°00′58″W
- Faculty: 190
- Colors: lilac
- Nickname: Buckeyes
- Website: dentistry.osu.edu

The Ohio State University College of Dentistry is one of the graduate and professional schools of The Ohio State University. The college is the first state-supported dental school in Ohio and consists of 11 academic divisions representing all major dental specialties. In addition to the Doctor of Dental Surgery (D.D.S.) and Bachelor of Science in Dental Hygiene degrees, the Ohio State College of Dentistry offers specialty training programs, advanced training programs, MS programs, and a Ph.D. program in Oral Biology. Outreach and Engagement activities include over 30 outreach and engagement efforts, which continue to expand.

== Advanced Education / Graduate programs ==
The College of Dentistry offers formal graduate programs leading to a Certificate, Masters (M.S.), and/or a Ph.D. in the following areas:

  - Dental Anesthesiology
  - Dental Hygiene
  - Endodontics
  - General Practice Residency
  - Oral and Maxillofacial Pathology
  - Oral and Maxillofacial Surgery
  - Orthodontics
  - Pediatric Dentistry
  - Periodontics
  - Prosthodontics
  - PhD in Oral Biology

== Research ==
The College of Dentistry receives extensive support from the National Institutes of Health and the National Science Foundation. Students and faculty members participate in both clinical and laboratory research. Faculty researchers have expertise in such fields as: gum disease (gingivitis and periodontitis), tooth decay (caries), tooth stain, plaque, and dentin hypersensitivity (pain). A research-focused combined D.D.S./Ph.D. degree program is also available.

== Clinics ==
The Ohio State Dental Clinics offer primary care and a full range of specialty clinics all in one building. The Dental Emergency Care Clinic is also available as a walk-in only service available to adult patients older than age 18.

== Notable alumni ==
- Gerald M. Bowers, D.D.S., M.S., '62, A pioneering researcher in periodontal regeneration
- Les Horvath - Heisman Trophy winner D.D.S., 1945
- Neil Luyk, Chair Oral and Maxillofacial Surgery Middlemore Hospital New Zealand, M.S. and Cert OMS '87
- Laurie McCauley, D.D.S., M.S., Ph.D., The William K. and Mary Anne Najjar Professor and chair, Department of Periodontics and Oral Medicine University of Michigan School of Dentistry, D.D.S. '85, M.S. '88
- Abdel Rahim Mohammad, DDS, MS, MPH, FAAOM, FACD, Clinical Professor of Geriatrics, College of Dentistry at The Ohio State University
- Joel Milton Weaver, D.D.S., Ph.D., R.Ph., OSU Professor Emeritus of Anesthesiology, D.D.S. '72
- Gordon J. McCarthy D.D.S. '04, Featured in 2012 Incisal Edge's Top 40 Dentists Under 40 in America

== History ==
In 1825, John Harris, a physician in the Ohio town of Bainbridge, provided medical and dental care for the community. He decided to share his dental experiences with other physicians in southern Ohio. His "school" for dental training yielded two colleagues, each of whom was a co-founder of one of the first two formal dental colleges in the world: The Baltimore College of Dental Surgery in 1840 and the Ohio College of Dental Surgery in Cincinnati in 1845.

The Ohio Medical University (OMU), founded in 1890 in Columbus, opened its doors on September 7, 1892. It was located on Park Street across from Goodale Park. It was a venture to bring health care to people in the north side of the city.

Starling Ohio Medical College OMU flourished and in 1907 it merged with the Starling Medical College to become the STARLING OHIO MEDICAL COLLEGE (SOMC). The "colleges" became "departments" again. In 1912, the Ohio General Assembly passed Senate Bill 120. This authorized Ohio State University to "create, establish, provide for, and maintain in said University a College of Medicine and a College of Dentistry."

The Ohio State University College of Dentistry on Park Street In 1913, a proposal was made to merge the Starling Ohio Medical College with Ohio State University. On July 1 of 1914, The Ohio State University Board of Trustees officially acquired the properties of the SOMC. Classes for the Ohio State College of Dentistry began on September 21, 1914, and graduation of its first class was held in the spring of 1915.

The Theta chapter of Omicron Kappa Upsilon, the national dental honorary society, was chartered at Ohio State in May 1916. When Ohio State acquired its dental school in 1914, four years of high school and a diploma were the only requirements for admission and the dental curriculum lasted just three years. For the entering class of 1916, the curriculum was expanded to four years. By 1921, one year of college was required for admission, and in 1928 a minimum of two years was imposed.

The Ohio State University College of Dentistry in Hamilton Hall In 1925, the Colleges of Medicine and Dentistry moved on campus to Hamilton Hall. Dentistry was located on the third and fourth floors in the north wing. The fourth floor held the main clinic and was two stories high. The roof contained skylights to enhance the light in the clinic. (When the sun is directed to the roof, one can still see a difference in the roof tiles indicating where the skylights were once positioned.)

The Ohio State University College of Dentistry in Postle Hall

In 1951, the college moved to a new building north of Hamilton Hall.

College of Dentistry Leadership

- Dr. Harry M. Semans 1906 – 1938
- Dr. Wendell D. Postle 1938 – 1964
- Dr. John Wilson 1965 – 1974
- Dr. Charles Howell 1975 – 1980
- Dr. William Wallace 1980 – 1990
- Dr. Henry Fields 1991 – 2001
- Dr. Jan Kronmiller 2001 – 2006
- Dr. Carole Anderson 2006 – 2011
- Dr. Patrick Lloyd 2011–2021
- Dr. Carroll Ann Trotman 2021–Present

== Accreditation ==
The Ohio State University College of Dentistry academic programs are accredited by the Commission on Dental Accreditation (CODA).

== See also ==
- American Student Dental Association
