= Attorney General Schneider =

Attorney General Schneider may refer to:

- Curt T. Schneider (born 1943), Attorney General of Kansas
- William Schneider (politician) (born 1959), Attorney General of Maine

== See also ==
- General Schneider (disambiguation)
