= Latham appliance =

Surgical device for cleft lip and palate repair

The Latham appliance is a medical appliance used to repair cleft lip and cleft palate in young children.

The appliance is surgically inserted by use of pins during the child's 4th or 5th month. After it is in place, the doctor, or parents, turn a screw daily to bring the cleft together to assist with future lip and/or palate repair.

It has been advocated that an ideal approach to treatment of infants with UCLP would be to move the entire maxilla forward using traction to stimulate an adjustment response of the maxillary sutures. Such an advancement would improve alignment of the dental arch. If this were accomplished prior to surgery, the cheiloplasty might result in more normal anatomic relationships with minimal mobilization of facial tissues.

The appliance has two acrylic pads joined by a posterior stainless steel hinged strut. The end of the adjustment screw, which is attached to the lesser segment, fits into a slot on the greater segment. The appliance is attached to the palatal bone using stainless steel pins placed 30-40" to the vertical. This pin placement facilitates good retention and avoids the developing teeth. Rotation of the screw applies a force that advances the lesser segment anteriorly.
