= Millard criteria =

Millard criteria (Rule of 10) is a set of rules, which is to be fulfilled for undertaking elective surgery for children, and mostly used for reference in cleft lip surgery. The criteria includes these prerequisites:

- 10 pounds (lb) or more of body weight (or easily converted to 5 kilograms), which usually happens in sync with 10 weeks of age (or easily converted to 3 months of age)
- 10 grams or more of Hemoglobin level in every 100 millilitres of blood (Hb level > 10 grams/dL)
- Not more than 10 thousand of leukocytes or white blood cells count in every microlitre of blood (WBC < 10,000/uL)

Translation to those points: the body weight and age criteria demands a child to have mature cells and tissue before enduring surgical and anesthetic procedures. At the same point, a child should have had proper body size that enables surgeons to manipulate the tissue without magnification aid. Adequate haemoglobin level will provide good tissue perfusion and oxygen delivery to cells needed for anaesthetic procedure, while leukocyte count will define a child is free from systemic infection that risks jeopardizing the surgery.

A child completing all Millard criteria may be taken for elective surgery, such as cleft lip surgery.
