= Oscar P. Snyder =

United States Army general

Oscar Peter Snyder
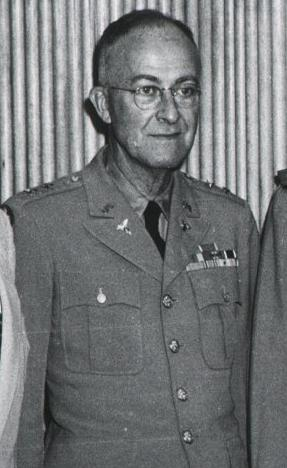
- Born: January 6, 1895; Millersburg, Ohio
- Died: February 21, 1983 (aged 88); Columbus, Ohio
- Military career
- Allegiance: United States of America
- Branch: United States Army
- Service years: 1916–56
- Rank: Major general
- Commands: Chief of the U.S. Army Dental Corps
- Conflicts: World War I World War II
- Awards: Legion of Merit (2)

Oscar Peter Snyder (January 6, 1895 – February 21, 1983) was a United States Army major general who served in the Army Medical Department as a Chief of the U.S. Army Dental Corps from 1954 to 1956.

== Biography ==
=== World War I ===
Oscar Peter Snyder was born to Emil and Anna (ńee Marchand) Snyder on 6 January 1895 near Millersburg, Holmes County, Ohio. He attended the Orrsville public schools graduating in 1912. He entered The Ohio State University College of Dentistry and graduated with the degree of Doctor of Dental Surgery in June 1916. He was commissioned a first lieutenant in the Regular Army on 24 October 1916. He first served at Columbus Barracks, Ohio until 18 December 1916 when he was transferred to Fort McIntosh, Laredo, Texas as Camp Hospital Dental Surgeon. In June 1917 Snyder was transferred to Fort McPherson, Georgia and then to Camp Hancock, Georgia as the 28th Infantry Division Dental Surgeon. The 28th Division was sent to France in May 1918 with the American Expeditionary Forces (AEF) where Snyder participated in the Marne Defensive, the Marne Offensive, Oise-Aisne Offensive and the Meuse-Argonne Offensive. He returned to the United States on 20 July 1919.

=== 1920s and 1930s ===
He was assigned to Camp Dodge, Iowa with temporary duty in Illinois, Wisconsin and Michigan. In September 1922 he was transferred to Fort Sheridan, Illinois where he met and married Louise McDonald in May 1923. In August 1924 he was sent to Camp Stotsenberg in the Philippines then to Sternberg General Hospital in Manila. His first child, Jane Louise Snyder, was born on 6 January 1927 and the family returned to the United States in April. Oscar P. 'Peter' Snyder Jr was born on 23 February 1930 while Snyder was assigned to Walter Reed General Hospital. In June 1931 he was transferred to Fort Thomas, Kentucky as Post Dental Surgeon. In August 1935 he enrolled in the Army Dental School and graduated from the Postgraduate Course in February 1936 and in August was transferred to the United States Military Academy, West Point, New York.

=== World War II ===
In April 1941 he reported to Lawson General Hospital, Atlanta, Georgia, and was sent to Melbourne, Australia on 12 April 1942 as Chief Dental Surgeon, Southwest Pacific Theater, Office of the Surgeon General. Snyder returned from the Pacific Theater in December 1944 and served at England General Hospital, Atlantic City, New Jersey until June 1945. Beginning in July 1945 he was Chief of the Dental Service at Fitzsimons General Hospital near Denver, Colorado.

=== Post-World War II ===
On 27 April 1948 he was transferred to Walter Reed Army Medical Center as Director of Dental Activities. In April 1953 he was transferred to Headquarters, Brooke Army Medical Center at Fort Sam Houston, Texas, as Director of Dental Activities. In April 1954 he was confirmed as Chief of the Army Dental Corps and Assistant to the Surgeon General, assuming command on 1 May 1954. This assignment ended upon his retirement from the U.S. Army on 30 November 1956.

=== Retirement ===
After retiring from the military Snyder taught at the Ohio State University College of Dentistry from January 1957 to June 1965. He died on 22 February 1983 in Columbus, Ohio.

== Awards and decorations ==

1st Row	Legion of Merit with Oak Leaf Cluster			
2nd Row	Mexican Border Service Medal	World War I Victory Medal with four battle clasps	Army of Occupation of Germany Medal	American Defense Service Medal
3rd Row	American Campaign Medal	Asiatic-Pacific Campaign Medal with two service stars	World War II Victory Medal	National Defense Service Medal

== Promotions ==
Commissioned a first lieutenant on 24 Oct 1916, to major on 6 October 1917**, to lieutenant colonel 27 October 1936, to colonel-temporary 26 June 1941, permanent-27 October 1942, brigadier general-permanent 27 April 1948, major general-temporary and permanent on 12 April 1954.

== Notes ==
- *A hand written note and photocopied baptismal certificate state that Snyder was born on 6 September 1895. When he enlisted in the Army the recruiter changed the date to 6 January and it was used on all official documents and celebrated on that date.
- **Due to legislation issued by Congress (H.R. 4897, 6 October 1917), which gave Dental Corps officers the same status as Medical Corps officers, Snyder never served in the rank of a captain.
