= CLPTM1L =

Protein-coding gene in humans

Identifiers
- Aliases: CLPTM1L, CRR9, CLPTM1-like, CLPTM1 like
- External IDs: OMIM: 612585; MGI: 2442892; HomoloGene: 12767; GeneCards: CLPTM1L; OMA:CLPTM1L - orthologs

Gene location (Human)
Chr.	Chromosome 5 (human)
Band	5p15.33	Start	1,317,752 bp
Band	5p15.33	End	1,345,099 bp

Gene location (Mouse)
Chr.	Chromosome 13 (mouse)
Band	13|13 C1	Start	73,752,125 bp
Band	13|13 C1	End	73,768,724 bp
RNA expression pattern
Bgee	Human / Mouse (ortholog); Top expressed in: mucosa of ileum; right lobe of thyroid gland; body of pancreas; left lobe of thyroid gland; oocyte; upper lobe of left lung; gonad; secondary oocyte; right lobe of liver; body of stomach / Top expressed in: lacrimal gland; salivary gland; submandibular gland; seminal vesicula; parotid gland; calvaria; vestibular membrane of cochlear duct; stroma of bone marrow; crypt of lieberkuhn of small intestine; medullary collecting duct; More reference expression data
BioGPS	n/a
Orthologs
Species	Human	Mouse
Entrez	81037	218335
Ensembl	ENSG00000049656; ENSG00000274811	ENSMUSG00000021610
UniProt	Q96KA5	Q8BXA5
RefSeq (mRNA)	NM_030782	NM_146047
RefSeq (protein)	NP_110409	NP_666159
Location (UCSC)	Chr 5: 1.32 – 1.35 Mb	Chr 13: 73.75 – 73.77 Mb
PubMed search
- Wikidata
View/Edit Human	View/Edit Mouse

Cleft lip and palate transmembrane protein 1-like protein (CLPTM1-like protein), also known as cisplatin resistance-related protein 9 (CRR9p), is a protein that in humans is encoded by the CLPTM1L gene. CRR9p is associated with cisplatin-induced apoptosis. CLPTM1L, which lies within a cancer susceptibility locus on chromosome 5 (5p15.33), has been found to be commonly over-expressed in lung tumors and to confer resistance to apoptosis caused by genotoxic agents in association with up-regulation of the anti-apoptotic protein, Bcl-xL. Inhibition of CLPTM1L has been shown to inhibit oncogenic transformation and tumorigenesis caused by the KRas oncogene partially through the PI3K/Akt survival signaling axis.

== See also ==
- Cleft lip and palate transmembrane protein 1
