= Cleft lip and palate transmembrane protein 1 =

Protein-coding gene in the species Homo sapiens

CLPTM1

Identifiers
- Aliases: CLPTM1, transmembrane protein, CLPTM1 regulator of GABA type A receptor forward trafficking
- External IDs: OMIM: 604783; MGI: 1927155; HomoloGene: 37464; GeneCards: CLPTM1; OMA:CLPTM1 - orthologs

Gene location (Mouse)
Chr.	Chromosome 7 (mouse)
Band	7|7 A3	Start	19,365,496 bp
Band	7|7 A3	End	19,398,958 bp
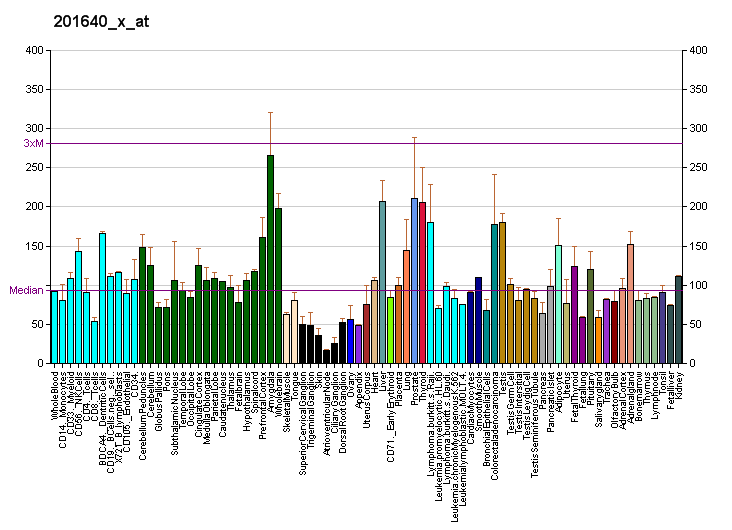

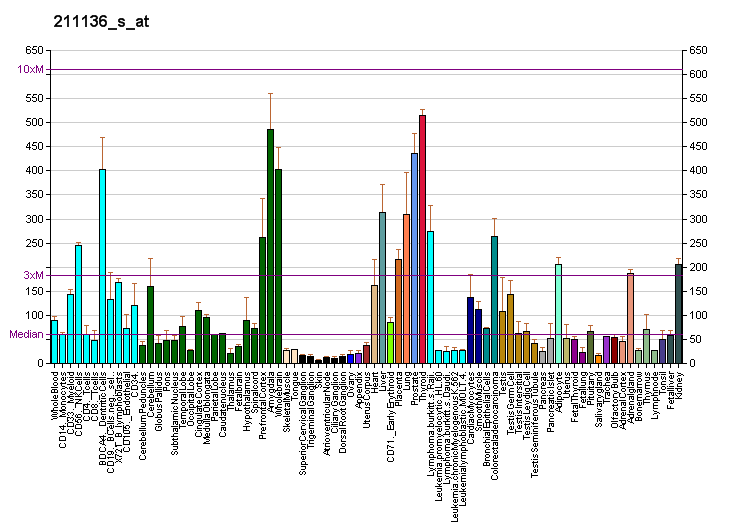
RNA expression pattern
Bgee	Human / Mouse (ortholog); Top expressed in: left adrenal gland; nucleus accumbens; stromal cell of endometrium; caudate nucleus; putamen; cingulate gyrus; amygdala; prefrontal cortex; right lobe of liver; body of stomach / Top expressed in: choroid plexus of fourth ventricle; yolk sac; entorhinal cortex; perirhinal cortex; CA3 field; right kidney; lactiferous gland; Ileal epithelium; tail of embryo; pyloric antrum; More reference expression data
BioGPS	More reference expression data
Gene ontology
Molecular function	protein binding
Cellular component	integral component of membrane; integral component of plasma membrane; membrane; external side of plasma membrane
Biological process	multicellular organism development; regulation of T cell differentiation in thymus; cell differentiation
Sources:Amigo / QuickGO
Orthologs
Species	Human	Mouse
Entrez	1209	56457
Ensembl	n/a	ENSMUSG00000002981
UniProt	O96005	Q8VBZ3
RefSeq (mRNA)	NM_001294; NM_001199468; NM_001282175; NM_001282176	NM_019649
RefSeq (protein)	NP_001269104; NP_001269105; NP_001285	NP_062623
Location (UCSC)	n/a	Chr 7: 19.37 – 19.4 Mb
PubMed search
- Wikidata
View/Edit Human	View/Edit Mouse

Cleft lip and palate transmembrane 1

Identifiers
- Symbol: CLPTM1
- Pfam: PF05602
- InterPro: IPR008429
Available protein structures:
- Pfam: structures / ECOD
- PDB: RCSB PDB; PDBe; PDBj
- PDBsum: structure summary

Cleft lip and palate transmembrane protein 1 (Clptm1) is a multi-transmembrane protein that in humans is encoded by the CLPTM1 gene. Clptm1 was characterized in 1995 as a surface membrane protein in the thymus during embryonic development in mice and is suggested to have an important role in T-cell development. A more recent study shows a role in GABAA receptor subunit intracellular anchoring and regulation resulting in an influence on synaptic strength Clptm1 belongs to a family of several eukaryotic cleft lip and palate transmembrane protein 1 sequences.

Cleft lip with or without cleft palate is a common birth defect that is genetically complex. The non-syndromic forms have been studied genetically using linkage and candidate-gene association studies with only partial success in defining the loci responsible for orofacial clefting. CLPTM1 encodes a transmembrane protein and has strong homology to two Caenorhabditis elegans genes, suggesting that CLPTM1 may belong to a new gene family. This family also contains the Homo sapiens cisplatin resistance related protein CRR9p which is associated with CDDP-induced apoptosis.
