= Palatoplasty =

- Specialty: Otorhinolaryngology
- ICD-9-CM: 27.6

Palatoplasty is a surgical procedure used to correct or reconstruct the palate in a person with a cleft palate. The goals of the procedure are to close the abnormal opening between the nose and mouth; help the patient develop normal speech; and aid in swallowing, breathing and normal development of associated structures in the mouth.

Any person with any degree of a cleft palate is a candidate for palatoplasty. The procedure is usually performed on infants. The ideal age for the patient is between six and twelve months. If the surgery is carried out much beyond three years of age, speech development may not be optimal. In 80% of cases, development of the palate and speech is normal after only one procedure.

== See also ==
- Oral and maxillofacial surgery
