= Demineralized bone matrix =

Bone graft with inorganic mineral removed

Demineralized bone matrix (DBM) is allograft bone that has had the inorganic mineral removed, leaving behind the organic "collagen" matrix. It was first discovered by Marshall Urist in 1965 that the removal of the bone mineral exposes more biologically active bone morphogenetic proteins. These growth factors modulate the differentiation of progenitor cells into osteoprogenitor cells, which are responsible for bone and cartilage formation. As a result of the demineralization process, DBM is more biologically active than undemineralized bone grafts; conversely the mechanical properties are significantly diminished.

== Current clinical options ==
The success of a bone graft is determined by its ability to recruit host cells to the site of the graft and modulate their conversion into bone forming cells such as osteoblasts, to repair the defect. This will depend on the osteoconductive, osteoinductive and osteogenic capabilities of the graft.

Currently, autograft bone harvested from the iliac crest is considered the 'gold standard' due to its superior osteogenic properties. However, associated donor site morbidity, an increased surgery and recovery time, and a limited supply of donor bone are limiting its use.

Allograft bone is a logical alternative to autograft. However, it must be rigorously processed and terminally sterilized prior to implantation to remove the risk of disease transmission or an immunological response. This processing removes the osteogenic and osteoinductive properties of the graft, leaving only an osteoconductive scaffold. These scaffolds are available in a range of preparations (such as morselized particles and struts) for different orthopaedic applications.

DBM has superior biological properties to undemineralised allograft bone, as the removal of the mineral increases the osteoinductivity of the graft.
