= Kardex =

Kardex may refer to:

- Kardex Group, a Swiss data-storage corporation
- Kardex (MAR), a genericised trademark for a medication administration record
- Tonawanda Kardex, an American football team active 1916–1921

== See also ==
- CardEx, an international phone-card event and expo in the 1990s
- Kardex is an early genericized trademark for visible files, an early product of Kardex Group
