= Remington Rand strike =

1936–1937 Remington Rand strike
- Part of Labor Unions
- Date: May 25, 1936–April 21, 1937 (90 years ago)
- Location: United States

External videos
- 1936 - Remington Rand Strike, Ohio 220572-05

From May 1936 to April 1937, a strike against the Remington Rand company was conducted by a federal union affiliated with the American Federation of Labor (AFL). The strike settlement would not be fully implemented until mid-1940. The union had managed to organize six plants of the company, which were located in the towns of Tonawanda, Ilion and Syracuse in New York; in Middletown, Connecticut; and in Marietta and Norwood in Ohio.

The strike is notorious for spawning the "Mohawk Valley formula," a corporate plan for strikebreaking to discredit union leaders, frighten the public with the threat of violence, use local police and vigilantes to intimidate strikers, form puppet associations of "loyal employees" to influence public debate, fortify workplaces, employ large numbers of strikebreakers, and threaten to close the plant if work is not resumed. The Mohawk Valley formula was described in an article by company president James Rand, Jr., and published in the National Association of Manufacturers Labor Relations Bulletin in the fourth month of the strike. The article was widely disseminated in pamphlet form by the National Association of Manufacturers (NAM) later that year.

In a landmark decision, the National Labor Relations Board called the Mohawk Valley formula "a battle plan for industrial war."

== Background ==
In March 1934, the AFL began organizing skilled workers at two typewriter companies, Underwood Typewriter Company and Remington Rand. The employees organized the District Council of Office Equipment Workers, a federal union affiliated with the Metal Trades Department of the American Federation of Labor. Six plants were organized in the towns of Tonawanda, Ilion and Syracuse in New York; in Middletown, Connecticut; and in Marietta and Norwood in Ohio.

James Rand, Jr., president of Remington Rand, refused to bargain with the union. On May 8, 1934, 6,500 workers struck to force the company to recognize the union and sign a collective bargaining agreement. On June 18, 1936, the firm recognized the union and signed a contract which provided wage increases and established a grievance procedure.

Remington Rand, however, continued a policy of harassment and obstruction toward the union. It often violated the contract in small ways (forcing the union to file time-consuming and costly grievances), harassed union leaders, and generally contested the union at every turn.

In February 1936, the District Council of Office Equipment Workers became the Remington Rand Joint Protective Board.

== Beginning of the strike ==
Worker anger had built high by May 1936, when the company spread rumors that its plants were being bought by an unknown firm that would no longer recognize the union. Remington Rand then announced it had purchased a typewriter plant in nearby Elmira and might close the Tonawanda and Syracuse facilities. The union demanded information on possible plant closures, which the company refused.

The union then threatened a strike. In retaliation, the company distributed its own strike ballots and claimed that it alone could speak for workers. Outraged union officials seized and destroyed the company's ballots, interrupted and broke up meetings at which ballots were handed out, and harassed and physically intimidated managers trying to conduct balloting.

The Joint Board quickly held its own strike vote. More than 75% of the union's members voted to strike. Union officials asked the company to submit the dispute to a federal mediator, but the company refused to do so. Instead, Remington Rand fired the presidents of the local unions in Tonawanda and Syracuse along with fifteen other union activists. Infuriated workers in Ilion, Syracuse and Tonawanda walked off their jobs on May 25, 1936, followed by Remington Rand workers in Ohio and Connecticut the following day.

== Violence during the strike ==
The Remington Rand strike was a particularly violent strike. Although no one died during the strike, both sides engaged in beatings with fists and clubs, rock and brick throwing, vandalism, threats and physical intimidation. But historians and federal officials point out that the company went out of its way to antagonize workers and use private security personnel (sometimes disguised as workers) to instigate violence and riots. The record before the National Labor Relations Board (NLRB) and the scholarly literature show that the level of violence in the strike was deliberately manipulated by Remington Rand, and was several orders of magnitude higher than it would have been had the company not taken the actions it did.

Notable incidents include:

- In mid-June 1936, the company sent 100 strikebreakers through the picket line toward the front gate of the plant in Tonawanda. The company deliberately withdrew its protection of the workers when they reached the picket line. A fight broke out between the strikebreakers and the 500 picketers. Tonawanda police, waiting nearby, descended on the picketers and beat hundreds with billy-clubs.
- Beginning July 3, 1936, a four-day running riot began around the Middletown, Ohio, plant. The riot began when the company attempted to bring hundreds of strikebreakers through the picket lines unprotected. Over the following two days, workers hurled stones at strikebreakers, keeping them from entering the plant. When the company attempted to bring the workers in on buses on July 7, workers seized and boarded the buses, then forced the strikebreakers off the buses. Two were parked at the plant gates and torn apart. A third was chased by police through the streets of the town, only to crash on the lawn in front of City Hall.
- On July 24, 1936, striking workers threw home-made bombs at plants in Middletown and Syracuse, injuring one policeman. The bombs did only minor damage.
- On August 12, 1936, Syracuse police shot and injured two strikers, leading the governor of the state to threaten to bring in the National Guard unless local authorities showed more restraint.
- On August 22, 1936, striking workers at the Middletown plant hurled large iron balls at police, injuring four.

== Strike tactics ==
The Remington Rand strike is notable for the wide array of aggressive anti-union tactics employed by the employer. The National Labor Relations Board (NLRB) documented these tactics in a 120-page decision, Remington Rand, Inc., 2 NLRB 626 (decided March 13, 1937). The tactics used were not merely inventive (although some had been used by employers before), but, as the NLRB argued, were specifically designed and utilized to undermine the democratic process, manipulate public opinion through deceit and terror, and violate federal law.

=== Plant closures ===
With the union out on strike, Remington Rand quickly began consolidating its plants. The company later admitted that it had long wanted to close several of its plants, but that the union was too strong and would not have permitted it. Remington Rand contracted with millwrights several months before the strike began (discussions which courts and federal agencies later interpreted as a sign of the company's bad-faith bargaining) to dismantle the plants. Within days of the strike's commencement, Remington Rand contractors began crating plant machinery in Middletown, Syracuse and Tonawanda. Workers tried blocking the millwrights and trucks from entering and leaving the plant but were mostly unsuccessful. Strikers subsequently pelted trucks with stones, bricks and bottles, or laid iron spikes in the roadway to puncture the tires of trucks.

Misleading information about plant closures was also common. When the strike began, the mayor of Syracuse met with Rand and won Rand's personal reassurance that the company would not close the plant. But Rand planned exactly that, and his lie was designed to win backing of city officials for the company's anti-union campaign. The company also often placed "For Sale" signs in front of factories or announced their closing in advertisements. In some cases, the company went so far as to hire private security guards to pose as millwrights to support its claim that it was closing plants. Announcements of plant closures were designed to demoralize striking union members and frighten workers who had remained on the job into staying. They also were used to terrorize local citizens who feared for the economic life of their towns. Often, company officials would later make statements suggesting that the plant would stay open if the union gave up the strike, statements which encouraged local citizens to put intense emotional, political and economic pressure on the union.

=== Use of private security forces ===
Remington Rand also hired very large numbers of private security forces to protect its property and attempt to re-open some facilities. The company had engaged in extensive pre-strike planning with "detective agencies" (a euphemism for private security guard companies) in all its locations. In discussions with these firms, the company clearly conveyed the attitude that it had every intention of provoking a strike in order to break the union, and would not engage in good-faith bargaining. One company which provided private security forces, led by Pearl Bergoff, received $25,850. Remington Rand claimed it had to hire its own private police forces to protect its property and the strikebreakers. But the union and local officials argued that Remington Rand's real goal was to foment trouble. As Middletown Mayor Leo Santangelo pointed out: "There were more policemen outside than there were men wanting to come in."

=== Support of local law enforcement ===
Remington Rand also relied heavily on local police and specially-sworn county sheriff's deputies to provide protection. Several months before the strike began, the company informed local officials that it intended to provoke the union and would need the cooperation of local officials. Many enthusiastically did so, believing that the company would close its plants (harming the city's tax base) if they did not. In Syracuse, for example, the mayor gave the company unlimited police protection. Where local officials resisted the company's request for help, Remington Rand intimidated them into offering assistance. The mayor of Ilion later admitted that he was forced to provide police protection: His own personal banker had threatened to call in his loans and delete his personal and business lines of credit, and a "citizens' committee" formed by the company threatened to institute a boycott against his business and a slander campaign against him personally if he did not cooperate.

Local law enforcement personnel played a particularly important role in terrorizing the population of Ilion and turning public opinion against the union. Remington Rand paid Herkimer County to deputize 300 special sheriff's deputies to provide protection for company and town property. Remington Rand armed the deputies with Remington handguns and billy-clubs, and bought civilian automobiles to serve as squad cars. While these deputies and the town police remained under the control of their respective governmental authorities, the company worked closely with county and town officials to heighten tensions within the town. Squads of six sheriff's deputies and one police officer were armed with shotguns and stationed at every road and path leading into the town. Local citizens had to obtain passes from the Remington Rand company to enter the town. Later, company officials disingenuously accused local police of using kid gloves on strikers, which gave local police the political cover they needed to increase the level of violence aimed at picketers.

=== Use of strikebreakers ===
Remington Rand also fired all striking workers and replaced them with permanent replacements. Initially, few replacement workers were willing to take the company up on its offer. The union ringed each plant with thousands of workers, family members and supporters, and few replacement employees were willing to run the gauntlet of angry, sometimes violent union members. Others feared reprisals against them and their families if they took work at the plant. At first, Remington Rand gave security guards a $5 a day bonus if they successfully made it past the picketers and into the plant, where they pretended to be workers. But the company soon began offering large bonuses for replacement workers, and in the depths of the Great Depression few people could afford to turn down work.

=== Misinformation ===
Remington Rand also made a significant number of false and misleading statements designed to mislead the media, demoralize strikers and reassure investors. Sixteen days into the strike, for example, company president James Rand announced an end to the strike at all six plants, a statement which roiled the union and led hundreds of workers to mistakenly accuse elected union leaders of selling out. In fact, no agreement had been reached. Two weeks later, Remington Rand announced that workers in Ohio had returned to work under a new collective bargaining agreement which offered highly favorable terms. The announcement demoralized workers in New York and Connecticut, and raised suspicions about the competence and reliability of union leaders. The truth was that only 21 of the 911 workers at the plant had accepted these terms, and they had not supported the strike. A few days later, Remington Rand officials falsely claimed that 5,300 of the company's workers had crossed picket lines and were back at work.

In Tonawanda, the company planted a rumor among the picketers that several union members were returning to work. The company then hired 85 security guards to impersonate these "returning workers," and armed them with bricks and clubs. When a pitched battle broke out between the impersonators and picketers, company photographers took pictures of the near-riot. The company shipped the security guards out of town that night and turned the photos over to the local newspapers—which duly printed them as "proof" that "labor goons" had attacked "honest working men." The corporation then used this incident to manipulate a state court into imposing a temporary injunction against the strikers.

Misinformation was also used to frighten local citizens and manipulate public opinion. For example, on June 9, 1936, Remington Rand announced that it had employed 500 strikebreakers to resume production at its plant in Syracuse. In fact, the company had hired no replacement workers at all. Working behind the scenes with the company, the local police then announced a major increase in the number of police protecting the Remington Rand plant. When violence died down in Ohio, President Rand announced he would "hire 1,000 men if necessary" to protect the plant. Angry union members reinforced their pickets, and when Rand attempted to bring even a small number of guards to the plant they were pelted with stones—leading to the violence Rand had claimed already existed.

=== Other tactics ===
The Remington Rand company also worked with local courts to influence the outcome of the strike. The company used relationships and ex parte communications with judges prior to the strike to ensure that strikers would be dealt with harshly, although the number of these cases appears to be limited. In Syracuse, for example, two teenaged girls were sentenced to 30 days in jail for merely waving a rubber rat at replacement workers. In Middletown, local judges handed down six-month prison sentences to a large number of picketers based solely on the testimony of two Remington Rand security guards. In many cases, however, the company manipulated events to ensure that law-and-order judges would impose the maximum sentence or the outcome the company desired. Remington Rand often incited picketers to riot. Working with local law enforcement officials, the company would then present evidence in court implicating workers but not management. This manipulation of the judicial system often led judges to severely restrict union picketing near company property. In New York, for example, a federal judge limited picketing to only four workers at a time, and all workers had to wear a large badge identifying themselves as such. (Nearly two years later, federal investigations exposed the company-law enforcement collusion.)

Remington Rand also formed "citizens' committees" controlled by the company to put additional pressure on the union. Federal investigators later found that these citizens' committees were founded and funded by the company, and used to intimidate businessmen, banks and others into withdrawing support from or opposing the striking workers. In New York, for example, landlords raised the rent of strikers to put pressure on them to return to work. Citizens' committees also put political pressure on local elected officials, bringing local and county law enforcement under the control of the firm. In Ohio, local officials order law enforcement personnel to padlock and seal local union offices after minor pretextual complaints by company officials. In Elmira, the mayor ordered the police to ban circulation of the local labor newspaper. Citizens' committees were also used to secretly manipulate public opinion against the union and its members. Unaware of the true nature of these committees, the media often reported their demands for an end to the strike or denunciations of union "violence" – which encouraged the public to turn against the strikers.

Remington Rand also engaged in threats and intimidation. The company hired at least 80 men and women to pose as religious missionaries, and had these individuals visit strikers' homes. Once in the home, the "missionary" would harangue the family and demand that the breadwinner return to work. In other cases, groups of company employees posing as "concerned citizens" would mass in front of strikers' homes and demand that the worker abandon the picket line, leave town, or return to work. These activities were often coordinated with company back-to-work campaigns and reinforced by mistaken media reports of large numbers of picket-line crossings.

== Events during the strike ==
Largely unprepared for the strike, the union was able to win at least one early battle against Remington Rand. The Democratic governor of the state of New York, Herbert H. Lehman, refused to allow the New York State Police to intervene in the strike, despite the company's demands.

Remington Rand began its misinformation campaign immediately. In mid-June, Remington Rand threatened to close its plants in Middletown, Norwood, Syracuse, and Tonawanda unless workers returned to work immediately. Politicians pleaded with union officials to end the strike. A few days later, Remington Rand announced (incorrectly) that union leaders in Ohio had accepted an offer to return to work. The announcement created deep divisions between leaders and members in the union, and between union chapters in the various plants. However, only 21 workers out of 911 had accepted the offer, and most of those had not been union members.

On July 6, the union held a mass demonstration in Syracuse in support of workers in Ohio who had rioted over the previous days. Despite the size of the Syracuse riot, company officials declared the strike "definitely broken."

On July 18, a federal judge significantly restricted union picketing at Remington Rand's plants in New York. The union was limited to only four picketing workers at a time, and all picketers had to wear large badges identifying themselves as union members. Federal officials later determined that the violence which led the court to impose the injunction had been instigated by Remington Rand.

On July 22, Governor Wilbur L. Cross of Connecticut asked Governor Martin L. Davey of Ohio and Governor Lehman of New York to meet with him and Rand's president to discuss an end to the strike. Despite interest from the governors and union, Cross abandoned his plan for a tri-state arbitration committee after a spate of violence at Remington Rand plants and receiving a host of pre-conditions from Rand himself.

The union won a few skirmishes in the strike in August 1936. New York governor Lehman ordered a special session of the appellate division of the New York Supreme Court to hear an emergency appeal of a state court ruling granting an injunction against the union under the State Anti-Injunction Law of 1935. The appeal was ultimately unsuccessful. After a fresh outbreak of violence in Syracuse on August 11, in which two strikers were shot and injured by local police, Governor Lehman threatened to replace policemen with National Guard troops unless local law enforcement authorities proved capable of more restraint.

Contract talks begin in earnest in late July 1936, three months into the strike. The AFL had filed a variety of unfair labor practice (ULPs) charges against Remington Rand, but the company had won a temporary injunction halting any NLRB hearings on the ULPs in mid-July. Remington Rand officials were particularly concerned that NLRB hearings would expose their anti-union tactics. Company officials, worried that the United States Supreme Court and other federal courts would uphold the National Labor Relations Act, began negotiations as a fall-back strategy. Those negotiations collapsed on September 2, 1936.

A major turning point in the strike came 10 days later. U.S. district court Judge John Knight lifted the temporary injunction and ordered the NLRB to proceed with its ULP hearings.

The NLRB hearings, as well as United States Senate hearings into strikebreaking in general, began in late September. Evidence of the extensive anti-union campaign in the Remington Rand strike became public in late November 1936, and made national headlines.

By March 1937, public exposure of the Remington Rand company's anti-union efforts had led to a significant deterioration in the firm's public support. The company did not cut back on its efforts, and rumor-mongering about plant closures and to demoralize workers was still effective. But public opinion and media opinion proved much harder to manipulate, and many elected officials were quietly withdrawing support for the company.

On March 11, 1937, United States Secretary of Labor Frances Perkins attempted to mediate an end to the strike. When Perkins attempted to reach Rand by telephone, his aides claimed to not know where he was. When Perkins sent him telegrams and letters, company staff said they did not know how to reach him. Perkins was forced to publish an open letter in newspapers in Connecticut, New York and Ohio, asking Rand to speak to her. He did so the next day, but refused to discuss the strike with her. The incident embarrassed and angered Perkins, but Rand's rudeness further eroded the company's public standing.

On March 13, 1937, the NLRB issued a decision finding Remington Rand guilty of violating federal labor law. The decision, Remington Rand, Inc., 2 NLRB 626, was an astonishing 120-page decision in which the board recounted nearly every anti-union tactic the company had undertaken in the last year. The board accused Rand of putting himself above the law and wantonly violating the National Labor Relations Act. The board's discussion of Remington Rand's actions was cast in moral terms. Although many of the actions were not necessarily illegal, the board was deeply distressed that the company and its president would engage in behavior which, in the board's view, constituted open economic and class warfare. The NLRB ordered Remington Rand to reinstate, with back pay, the union members who had been discharged, to reinstate all workers still on strike, to dismantle its company unions, and recognize the union in its six existing plants as well as the new plant in Elmira.

Rand refused to obey the NLRB order. Instead, the same day that the board issued its opinion, he agreed to meet with Perkins and discuss the strike.

The NLRB's ruling, however, placed the company in a difficult legal position, and Remington Rand quickly reached an agreement with the union after a short session mediated by Perkins. Terms of the agreement were not released for a month.

The NLRB immediately sought a federal court ruling ordering Remington Rand to obey its orders.

Remington Rand's position in the strike worsened when a federal grand jury indicted James Rand, Jr., and Pearl Bergoff, owner of Bergoff Industrial Service (a strikebreaking "detective agency"), of violating the Byrnes Act, a federal law enacted in 1936 which forbade the interstate transportation of strikebreakers.

On April 21, 1937, union members approved a settlement with Remington Rand permitting all workers to return to their jobs. Initially, some workers refused to agree to the pact, but a month's lobbying by the AFL led to overwhelming passage.

Rand and Bergoff were acquitted of violating the Byrnes Act on November 18, 1937.

Remington Rand, however, continued to resist the NLRB's order. But on February 14, 1938, Judge Learned Hand, writing for a unanimous court, ruled in National Labor Relations Board v. Remington Rand, Inc. 94 F.2d 862 (1938), that the company must obey the terms of the NLRB's decision. Remington Rand appealed to the U.S. Supreme Court, which refused to grant certiorari, thereby upholding the appellate court's ruling.

Remington Rand began slowly furloughing strikebreakers after the Supreme Court's refusal to hear its case.

== Aftermath of the strike ==
Another two years would pass before the NLRB's order in Remington Rand, Inc. would be fully implemented.

During the strike, Remington Rand had established company unions at all its plants. Now the AFL and these company unions battled one another to represent the workers at the firm. In late June 1938, the company union demanded an immediate NLRB election to determine whether employees should continue to have a union or not. The AFL argued that no election was appropriate until all striking workers had been rehired. The two sides battled repeatedly over the election issue, and in October 1938 announced an agreement.

Remington Rand refused to implement the terms of the agreement, however. In August 1939 the company union again petitioned the NLRB to hold elections to determine whether employees wished to have a union or not. The union filed a series of ULPs in September and October, leading to another round of NLRB hearings. The situation deteriorated so badly that union members in Tonawanda struck in early April 1940. The strike spread and violence quickly broke out. Unwilling to undergo another large strike, Remington Rand agreed to dismantle its company unions on April 8, 1940.

Despite the series of agreements with the AFL and the NLRB, Remington Rand continued to resist implementing the court's order. On June 4, 1940, the NLRB filed suit against the company seeking to have it declared in contempt of court. Remington Rand had enough, and on June 30, 1940, agreed to dismantle its company unions and recognize the AFL.

== The "Mohawk Valley formula" ==
The June 1936 issue of the NAM's Labor Relations Bulletin immortalized the "Mohawk Valley formula" as a classic blueprint for union busting. The nine-point formula, as purportedly devised by James Rand, Jr., is as follows:

1. When a strike is threatened, label the union leaders as "agitators" to discredit them with the public and their own followers. Conduct balloting under the foremen to ascertain the strength of the union and to make possible misrepresentation of the strikers as a small minority. Exert economic pressure through threats to move the plant, align bankers, real estate owners and businessmen into a "Citizens' Committee."
2. Raise high the banner of "law and order", thereby causing the community to mass legal and police weapons against imagined violence and to forget that employees have equal right with others in the community.
3. Call a "mass meeting" to coordinate public sentiment against the strike and strengthen the Citizens' Committee.
4. Form a large police force to intimidate the strikers and exert a psychological effect. Utilize local police, state police, vigilantes and special deputies chosen, if possible, from other neighborhoods.
5. Convince the strikers their cause is hopeless with a "back-to-work" movement by a puppet association of so-called "loyal employees" secretly organized by the employer.
6. When enough applications are on hand, set a date for opening the plant by having such opening requested by the puppet "back-to-work" association.
7. Stage the "opening" theatrically by throwing open the gates and having the employees march in a mass protected by squads of armed police so as to dramatize and exaggerate the opening and heighten the demoralizing effect.
8. Demoralize the strikers with a continuing show of force. If necessary turn the locality into a warlike camp and barricade it from the outside world.
9. Close the publicity barrage on the theme that the plant is in full operation and the strikers are merely a minority attempting to interfere with the "right to work". With this, the campaign is over—the employer has broken the strike.
