= Zwe Ohn Chein =

Burmese inventor, writer and teacher

- Born: Ohn Chein; 1 May 1910; Mandalay, British Burma
- Died: 24 March 1979 (aged 68)
- Education: Rangoon University
- Occupation: Inventor
- Known for: Inventing a Burmese shorthand technique
- Spouse: Than Yi
- Children: 4

Zwe Ohn Chein (ဇွဲအုံးချိန်) was a Burmese inventor, writer and teacher, best known for inventing a Burmese shorthand technique and writing books on Burmese shorthand and typewriting in Burma (Myanmar).

== Early life and education ==
Zwe Ohn Chein, born Ohn Chein, the ninth of ten siblings, was born in Mandalay, Burma to rice merchants. His parents lost their properties during a cyclone. Zwe Ohn Chein then supported his parents with a florist business. After his parents passing, he trekked to Rangoon (Yangon) on a bicycle to become a clerical assistant at age 20. As he was fluent in English, he taught himself Pitman shorthand which he then used to invent his own Burmese shorthand technique to skill generations of Burmese office workers.

== Marriage and family ==
Zwe Ohn Chein married Than Yi in 1939, and the couple had four children.

== Career ==
Zwe Ohn Chein started writing books on Burmese shorthand and typewriting in the 1950s after starting up Zwe Ohn Chein Shorthand College in 1946. By around 1956, he had successfully established the college, published books on Burmese shorthand and typewriting, and was the headmaster and the controller of the College. Around 1958, he won a contract with Remington typewriters for his typewriting books to accompany the sale of each Remington Burmese typewriter in Burma. As he had been unable to go to college due to his parents financial situation in his early years, even with the success of Zwe Ohn Chein Shorthand College, he felt unfulfilled and decided to study Burmese language at the University of Yangon. He graduated with a Bachelor of Arts degree in 1962, around the same time his eldest daughter was studying at the Medical School of Rangoon University.

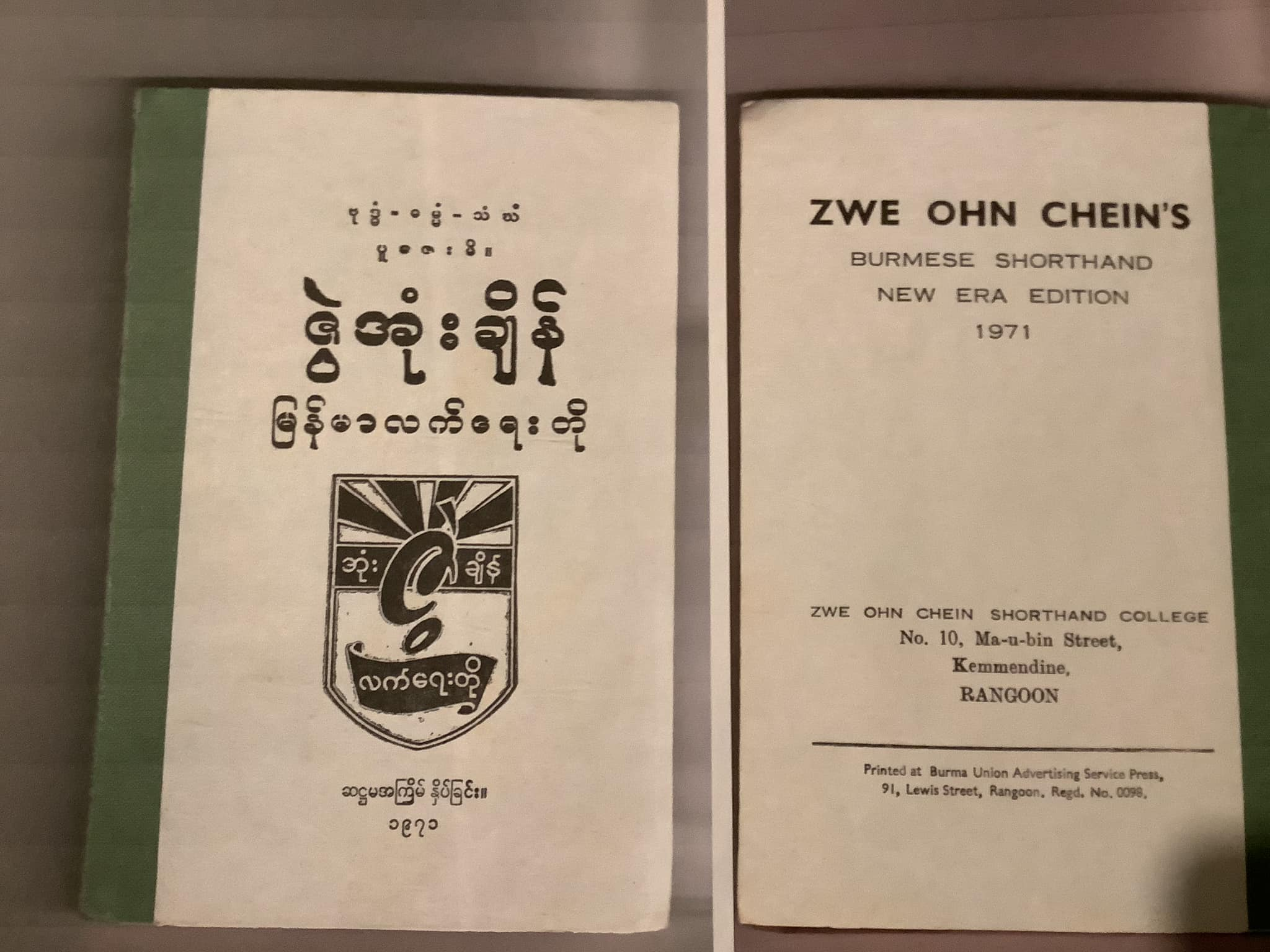
Burmese Shorthand Textbook

== Legacy ==
After Zwe Ohn Chein's death in 1979, his widow Than Yi became the headmistress and the controller of Zwe Ohn Chein Shorthand College until her death in 1997.

Two of his books are part of the Saxon State Library - State and University Library Dresden (SLUB) collection of stenographic literature.

https://katalog.slub-dresden.de/en/id/0-1485287987

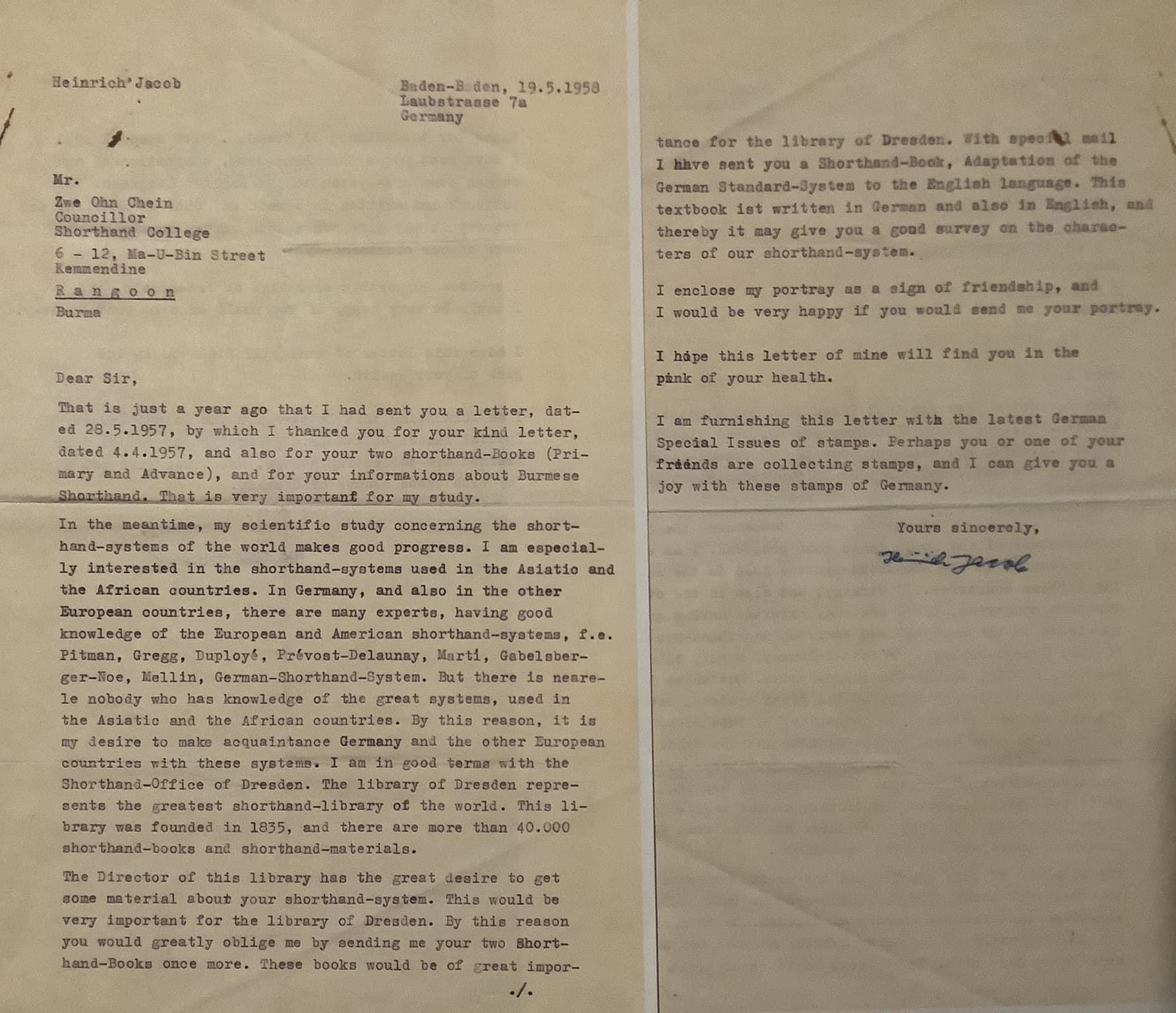
