= Library Bureau =

Company that sold supplies and equipment to libraries and businesses, 1876–1950s

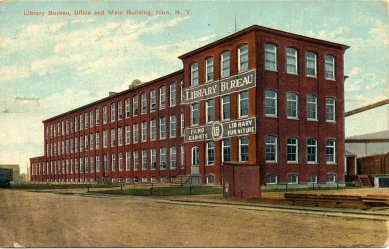
Library Bureau office and factory, Ilion, New York, 1911

The Library Bureau was established by Melvil Dewey in 1876 to sell catalog cards, drawers and card cabinets to American libraries. By 1893 the firm had expanded into other types of office equipment to support the emerging technologies of typewriters and stenography machines. In 1927, the Library Bureau was absorbed into the Remington Rand company.

== Library supplier ==
The inaugural meeting of the American Library Association took place in Philadelphia in 1876, coinciding with the Centennial Exposition. A group called the "Cooperation Committee on Library Supplies" that met at the meeting agreed on the need of libraries to achieve economies of scale in purchasing. The ALA set up a department, run by Dewey, to sell supplies to libraries at reduced cost. Supplies included card stock (in a standard size agreed at the first ALA meeting), catalog cabinets with drawers, bookends, furniture and shelving. In 1879 this function was taken over by Dewey to be incorporated into his existing businesses. Dewey later separated the library supply business from his other enterprises in 1888 and called this new entity "The Library Bureau." Dewey ceased being involved in the day-to-day operation of the company by the 1890s; the company continued for another six decades.

During the 1880s and 1890s, the Library Bureau prospered by supplying to many of the new Carnegie Libraries being built. It opened a number of large factories to provide furniture and supplies. It sold merchandise and services through a network of sales offices and distributors in the United States (46 in 1922), England (4), France (1), and Belgium.

In Boston, its headquarters operated from offices located successively at Hawley Street, Franklin Street, and Atlantic Avenue.

== Supplier to businesses ==
In the 1890s, the Library Bureau introduced "vertical filing" in its products. Vertical filing meant the filing of cards and papers on their vertical edges instead of placed flat on a desk or shelf. The company soon became a large supplier of filing equipment, supplies, and expertise to business and government. The Bureau introduced guides for the documents in filing drawers and file folders and won a gold medal when it displayed this system at the Chicago World's Fair in 1893. In its 1894 catalog the Bureau reported that nearly all of its products aimed at the library market were also being sold to businesses. Library Bureau schools in major cities taught business filing to clerical workers, primarily to young women.

By this time, Melvil Dewey remained a significant investor but was no longer involved in running the business, retaining, however, the honorary title of President.

It opened a large factory in 1909 in a brick building at 224 Albany Street, Cambridge, Massachusetts; in 1918, the adjacent building, 230 Albany Street, became its headquarters. By 1925, the Albany Street factory employed 450 workers. By 1922, the Library Bureau had factories in Cambridge, Chicago, New York City, London, and Ilion, New York.

Between 1896 and 1899 Library Bureau collaborated with Herman Hollerith's Tabulating Machine Company (TMC) to distribute its punched cards processing machines, with the Library Bureau providing the cards. The market included the government census of 1890, railroads and insurance companies. TMC eventually became International Business Machines, IBM.

== Patents ==
The Library Bureau further developed the technology of card indexes and was awarded at least 19 patents. These include improvements to card drawers, such as the metal rod that prevents the cards from spilling from the drawer, improvements to the cards themselves, and designs for filing cabinet furniture.

== Successors ==
In 1927, the Library Bureau was absorbed along with a number of suppliers of office supplies and equipment by the newly formed Remington Rand holding company. Remington Rand continued to use the brand name "Library Bureau" into the 1950s.

After Remington Rand and its successor companies had stopped using the Library Bureau brand name, they sold the name to a furniture company in Maryland.

== See also ==
- L. B. Speedac, a visible file system commercialized by the Library Bureau
- Kardex Group, whose various predecessor companies were contemporaries in the industry of pre-computer card-based indexing and cataloguing systems
