= Mohawk Valley formula =

The Mohawk Valley formula is a plan for strikebreaking purportedly written by the president of the Remington Rand company James Rand, Jr. around the time of the Remington Rand strike at Ilion, New York in 1936–37.

The plan includes discrediting union leaders, frightening the public with the threat of violence, using local police and vigilantes to intimidate strikers, forming associations of "loyal employees" to influence public debate, fortifying workplaces, employing large numbers of replacement workers, and threatening to close the plant if work is not resumed.

The Remington Rand company did indeed ruthlessly suppress the strikes, as documented in a ruling by the National Labor Relations Board, and the plan has been accepted as a guide to the methods that were used. At least one source names the strikebreaker Pearl Bergoff and his so-called "Bergoff technique" as the origin of the formula. Rand and Bergoff were both indicted by the same federal grand jury for their roles in the Remington Rand strike.

Noam Chomsky has described the formula as the result of business owners' trend away from violent strikebreaking to a "scientific" approach based on propaganda. An essential feature of this approach is the identification of the management's interests with "Americanism", while labor activism is portrayed as the work of un-American outsiders. Workers are thus persuaded to turn against the activists and toward management to demonstrate their patriotism.

== Elements of the formula ==
The following is the text of the Mohawk Valley formula as written by the National Labor Relations Board:

1. When a strike is threatened, label the union leaders as "agitators" to discredit them with the public and their own followers. Conduct balloting under the foremen to ascertain the strength of the union and to make possible misrepresentation of the strikers as a small minority. Exert economic pressure through threats to move the plant, align bankers, real estate owners and businessmen into a "Citizens' Committee".
2. Raise high the banner of "law and order", thereby causing the community to mass legal and police weapons against imagined violence and to forget that employees have equal rights with others in the community.
3. Call a "mass meeting" to coordinate public sentiment against the strike and strengthen the Citizens' Committee.
4. Form a large police force to intimidate the strikers and exert a psychological effect. Utilize local police, state police, vigilantes and special deputies chosen, if possible, from other neighborhoods.
5. Convince the strikers their cause is hopeless with a "back-to-work" movement by a puppet association of so-called "loyal employees" secretly organized by the employer.
6. When enough applications are on hand, set a date for opening the plant by having such opening requested by the puppet "back-to-work" association.
7. Stage the "opening" theatrically by throwing open the gates and having the employees march in a mass protected by squads of armed police so as to dramatize and exaggerate the opening and heighten the demoralizing effect.
8. Demoralize the strikers with a continuing show of force. If necessary turn the locality into a warlike camp and barricade it from the outside world.
9. Close the publicity barrage on the theme that the plant is in full operation and the strikers are merely a minority attempting to interfere with the right to work. With this, the campaign is over—the employer has broken the strike.

A similar, although more nuanced and longer, version was published in The Nation in 1937.

== See also ==
- House Committee on Un-American Activities
