= Karl Karsten =

Karl Karsten may refer to:

- Karl G. Karsten (1891–1968), American economist, statistician, businessman, inventor and author
- Karl Johann Bernhard Karsten (1782–1853), German mineralogist
