= Rolodex =

Rotating card file device

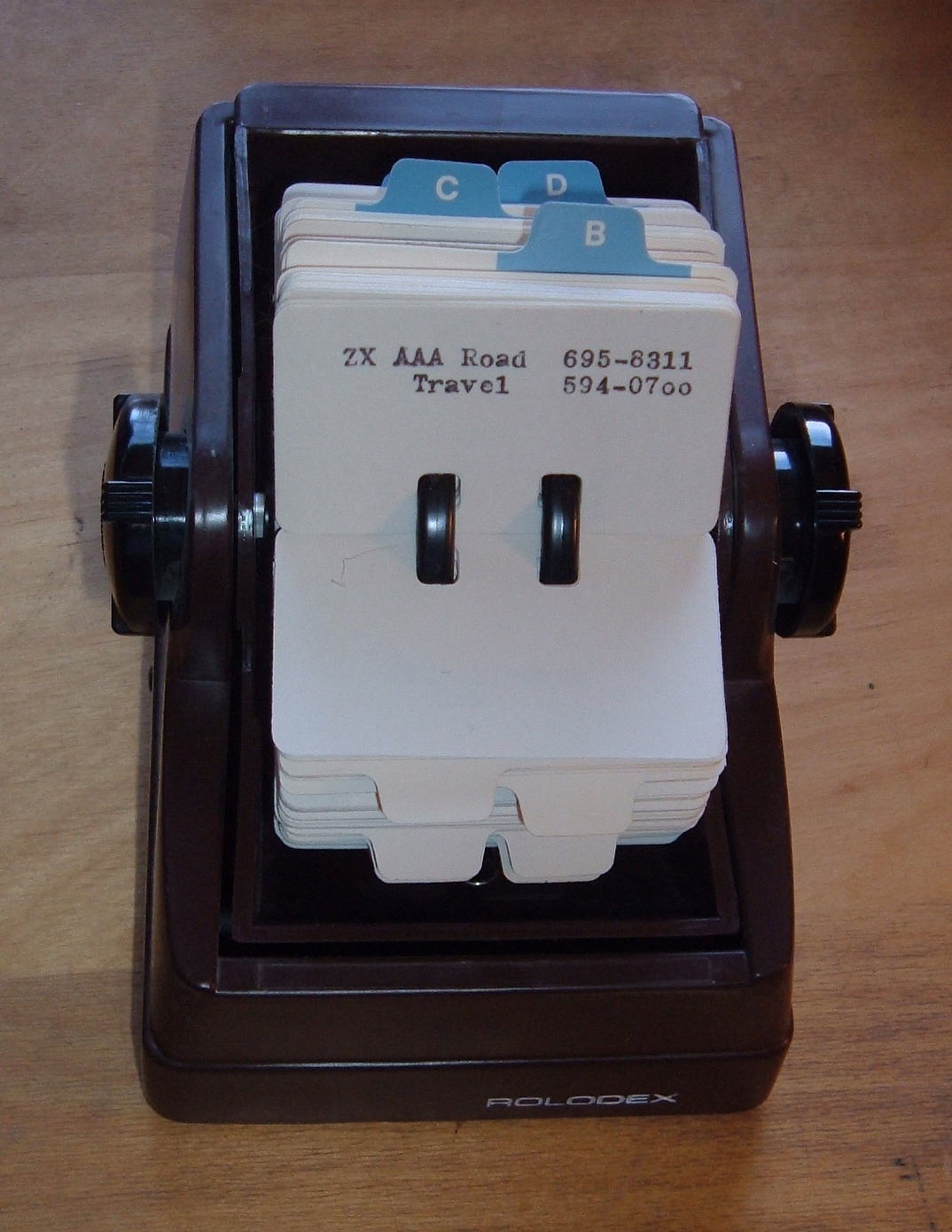
A Rolodex file used in the 1970s

A Rolodex is a rotating card file device used to store a contact list. It has generally come to describe an effect or characteristic of the small-world network of a business's investors, board of directors, or the value of a CEO's contacts, or in organizational structure. Models have been exhibited in the Smithsonian Institution.

== History ==
The Rolodex was invented in 1956 by Danish engineer Hildaur Neilsen, the chief engineer of Arnold Neustadter's company Zephyr American, a stationery manufacturer in New York. Neustadter was often credited with having invented it. First marketed in 1958, it was an improvement to an earlier design called the Wheeldex. The Wheeldex name was registered as a United States trademark by Scholfield Service, Inc. (USPTO Serial No. 71321669). Zephyr American also invented, manufactured and sold the Autodex, a spring-operated phone directory that automatically opened to the selected letter; Swivodex, an inkwell that did not spill; Punchodex, a paper hole puncher; and Clipodex, an office aid that attached to a stenographer's knee. Rolodex also marketed non-rotary (linear) tub-like card-file systems using the same cards (size and notches) as the rotary files.

Neustadter retired and sold out to a larger firm in 1970. The Rolodex remained popular throughout the 1980s, and individual Rolodexes containing a large amount of information were considered valuable, and lawsuits were filed by companies against employees who attempted to take their Rolodex with them when leaving the company. A 1985 episode of the detective TV series Moonlighting involved a stolen Rolodex being ransomed for $50,000 – a figure reflecting the value of the data it contained. The system fell out of widespread use in the 2000s, as digital storage became the norm. However, Rolodex cards are still produced, and have a niche usership.

== Images ==
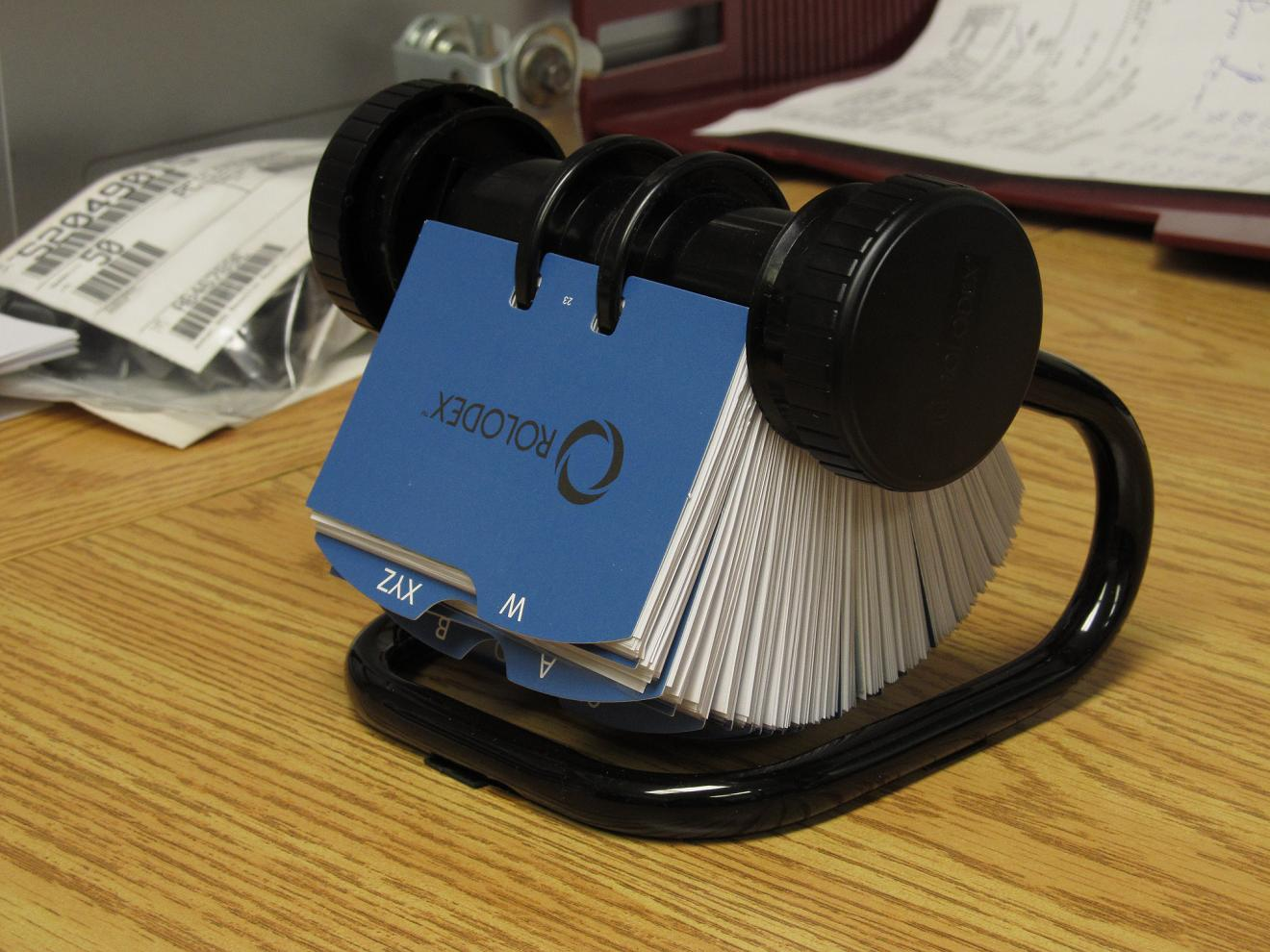
Rolodex 67236 rotary business card file

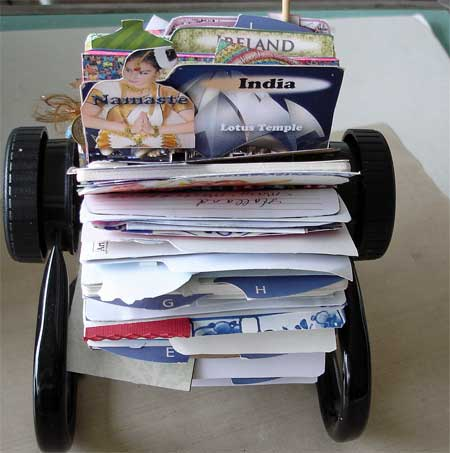
A decorative rolodex

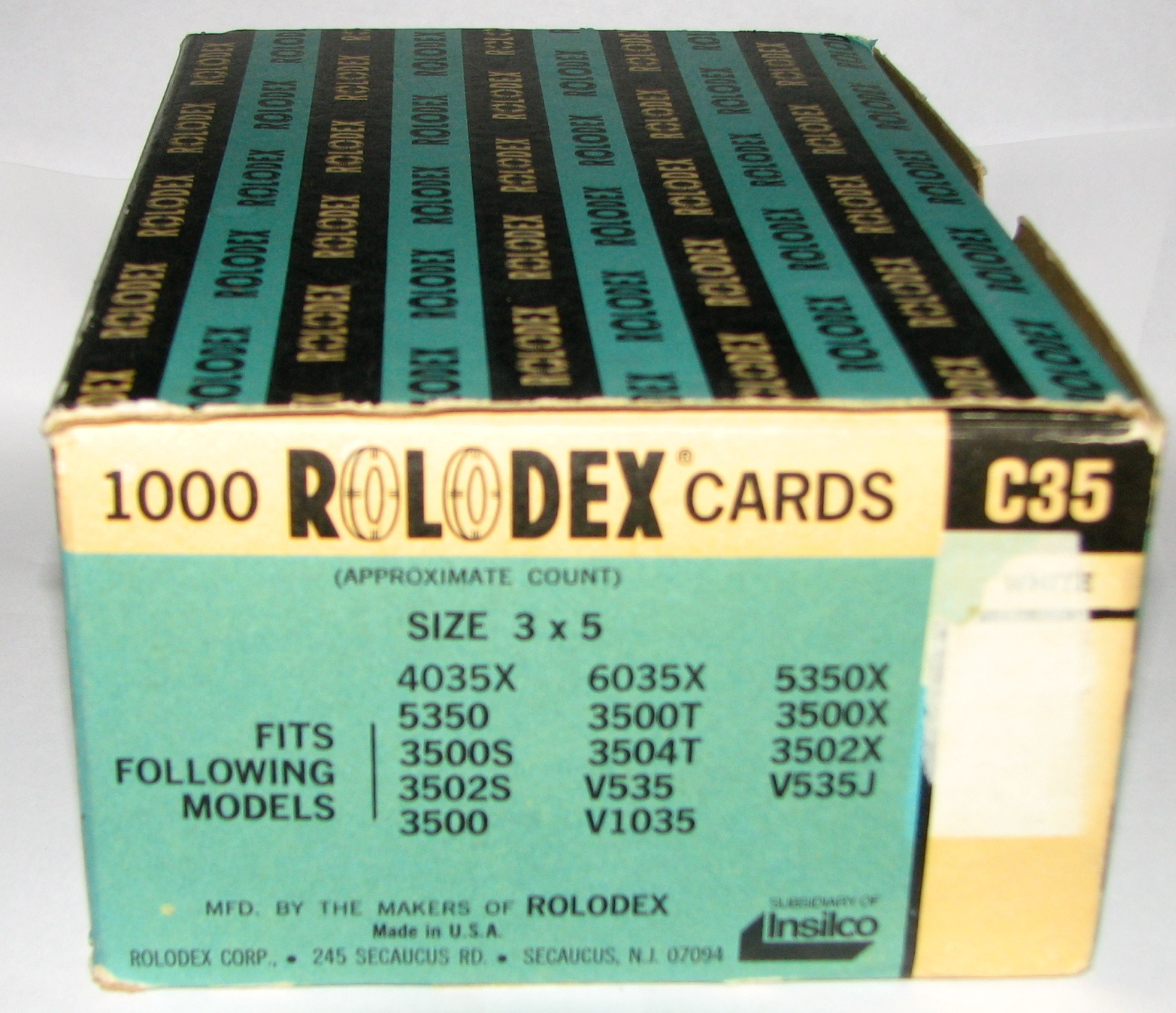
Rolodex cards refill box

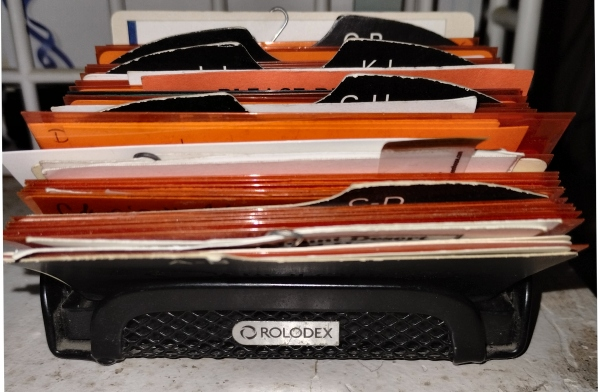
Linear Rolodex

== See also ==
- Address book – Database used for storing contact details
- Card catalog – Register of bibliographic items
- Microsoft Cardfile – Software of personal information manager type
- Visible file – Type of paper filing system
