= Pearl Bergoff =

American strikebreaker

Pearl Louis Bergoff (April 23, 1875 or 1878-August 11, 1947) was an American strikebreaker noted for violent tactics from the early 1900s through the 1930s.

== Early life ==
Bergoff was born in Detroit, Michigan. His birth date is given as April 23, 1875 in his 1918 draft registration and a 1920 passport application and the same date in 1878 in a 1924 passport application. At his death in 1947, The New York Times reported that he gave his age to the hospital as 62, but that other sources indicated he was 68. He was named Pearl because his mother wanted a girl.

His father Julius, who was born in Germany, was an itinerant fish-trader and land speculator, and abandoned the family when Bergoff was 13.

== Career ==
Bergoff worked as a spotter on the Metropolitan Street Railway in Manhattan. His job was to watch conductors to verify that they recorded all the fares they accepted. He opened the Vigilant Detective Agency in 1905.

Bergoff was in the employ of strikebreaker James A. Farley (1874–1913) in 1906, working as the bodyguard to Stanford White, when White was murdered by Harry Kendall Thaw at Madison Square Garden. By selling his diary of the sensational crime to the New York World, Bergoff raised the money to fund the company founded with his brother Leo, the Bergoff Brothers Strike Service and Labor Adjusters, which was established in 1907, with offices in the Schubert Building at 39th Street and Broadway in Manhattan.

The company's early strikebreaking actions were characterized by extreme violence. A 1907 strike of garbage cart drivers resulted in numerous confrontations between strikers and the strikebreakers, even when protected by police escorts. Strikers sometimes pelted the strikebreakers with rocks, bottles, and bricks launched from tenement rooftops. When longshoremen went on strike in 1907, the steamship companies hired Bergman, who brought in black and Italian immigrant strikebreakers. Bergoff relied on thugs from the Monk Eastman gang to "ride herd on the assembled scabs."

=== Pressed Steel Car Strike of 1909 ===
In 1909, the Pressed Steel Car Company at McKees Rocks, Pennsylvania, fired forty men, and eight thousand employees representing sixteen nationalities walked out under the banner of the Industrial Workers of the World. The company hired Bergoff's agency, who in turn hired strikebreaking toughs from the Bowery, and shipped vessels filled with unsuspecting immigrant workers directly into the strike zone. Other immigrant strikebreakers were delivered in boxcars, and were not fed during a two-day period. Later they worked, ate, and slept in a barn with two thousand other men. Their meals consisted of cabbage and bread.

At the end of August a gun battle erupted, leaving six dead, six dying, and fifty wounded. Public sympathy began to swing away toward the strikers. There were violent confrontations between strikers and strikebreakers, but also between strikebreakers and guards when terrified workers demanded the right to leave. One Austro-Hungarian immigrant who managed to escape informed his government that workers were being held against their will, resulting in an international incident. In addition to kidnapping, strikebreakers complained of deception, broken promises about wages, and tainted food.

Early in September the company acknowledged defeat and negotiated with the strikers. Twenty-two had died in the strike. But Bergoff's business was not hurt by the defeat; he boasted of having as many as ten thousand strikebreakers on his payroll. He was getting paid as much as $2,000,000 per strikebreaking job by large industrial clients.

Even before the strike was over, and then in more detail in 1911, the strikebreakers appeared before federal panels to describe their own living and working conditions after they were brought to the conflict. Held inside the plant or in boxcars against their will, fleeced, stolen from, physically threatened, and given rotten food, one hearing witness collapsed and was diagnosed with ptomaine poisoning. By August 28, 200 of the strikebreakers had responded by banding together in their own improvised union. They had quit work and were camping on the nearby banks of the Ohio River in an attempt to collect back wages, naming Chief of Police Farrell of the Coal and Iron Police and Pearl Bergoff's lieutenant Sam Cohen as those most responsible. Lawyer for the strikebreakers was the ambitious William N. McNair, who alleged that this treatment amounted to peonage. (McNair would later serve one term as Mayor of Pittsburgh in 1934.)

During these hearings, Bergoff explained that "musclemen" under his employ would "get... any graft that goes on", suggesting that was to be expected "on every big job." Other testimony indicated that Bergoff's "right-hand man", described as "huge in stature, weighing perhaps 240 pounds", surrounded himself with thirty-five guards who intimidated and fleeced the strikebreakers, locking them into a boxcar prison with no sanitation facilities when they defied orders.

== Subsequent career ==
Bergoff settled in Bayonne, New Jersey, built the biggest office building in the city (which still stands), and sent strikebreakers to the Bayonne refinery strikes of 1915–1916. He was hired to break a strike at the Erie Railroad in 1920, for which he was paid $2 million. He also broke strikes of street cleaners and the Interborough Rapid Transit and Brooklyn Rapid Transit in New York City.

Bergoff once said that he had earned $10 million, and his annual salary from 1914 to 1924 was reputed to have been $100,000, plus dividends of $200,000 to $400,000.

Bergoff's business declined around 1923. He went into the land business in Florida, then returned to New Jersey and strikebreaking around 1930 with renewed success. A sympathetic article in the January 1935 Fortune lists a few of the "172 strike jobs" Bergoff's firm had handled, with notes such as "1907, Munson Steamship Line stevedores. First fatality" and "1910, Philadelphia Rapid Transit, motormen, conductors. Streetcar strikes are most fun; strikebreakers pocket fares."

In September 1934, Bergoff was hired in response to a textile workers strike in Georgia and duly took two-hundred men to the South. When Georgia Governor Eugene Talmadge found out that Bergoff and his men were in the state, he had the Georgia National Guard detain and deport them to New York.

In December 1935 Bergoff was the subject of a book-length exposé by the labor editor of the New York Post, Edward Levinson. The book was called I Break Strikes!. Labor leader Walter Reuther credited this examination of Bergoff's practices as a major impetus to the creation of the La Follette Committee.

Bergoff's involvement in the violent Remington Rand strike of 1936–1937 resulted in his program of anti-union activities, the "Bergoff Technique", being republished and repackaged as the Mohawk Valley formula. It also resulted in the federal indictments of James Rand Jr. and Bergoff for violation of the 1936 Byrnes Act prohibiting the movement of strikebreakers across state lines.

Both men were acquitted on November 18, 1937. But it would be his last major engagement. With his business model outlawed, and his private detective license subsequently revoked by the state of New York, Bergoff retired from public view.

== Personal life ==
He died on August 11, 1947, in New York City. He was survived by his wife, Libby, a son and a daughter.

== See also ==
- Anti-union violence
- History of union busting in the United States
- Mohawk Valley formula
- Union busting
