= Arnold Neustadter =

American inventor and businessman

- Born: 25 August 1910
- Died: April 17, 1996 (aged 85)
- Engineering career
- Projects: Rolodex

Arnold Neustadter (25 August 1910 – 17 April 1996) was an American inventor and businessman. He invented the Rolodex desktop rotating card file and other office equipment with Danish engineer Hildaur Neilson, which has been called "a triumph of low technology" and "a lasting symbol of the art of networking".

Neustadter's earlier inventions included the Autodex, a spring-operated phone directory that automatically opened to the selected letter, Swivodex, an inkwell that did not spill, Punchodex, a paper hole puncher, and Clipodex, a transcription aid that attached to a stenographer's knee.
