= CardEx =

Estonian special phonecard with CardEx logo.

CardEx was international phone card event and expo. For this event many special CardEx phone cards were produced in many countries.

It existed and was held in:

- CardEx 94 (Amsterdam, The Netherlands - September 8–11, 1994)
- CardEx 95 (Maastricht, The Netherlands - September 13–17, 1995)
- CardEx 96 (Maastricht, The Netherlands - October 9–13, 1996)
- CardEx 97 (Brussels, Belgium - October 24–26, 1997)
- CardEx 98 (Brussels, Belgium - November 19–21, 1998)

The bankruptcy of Cardex was announced a month before Cardex 98.
