= Visible file =

Type of paper filing system

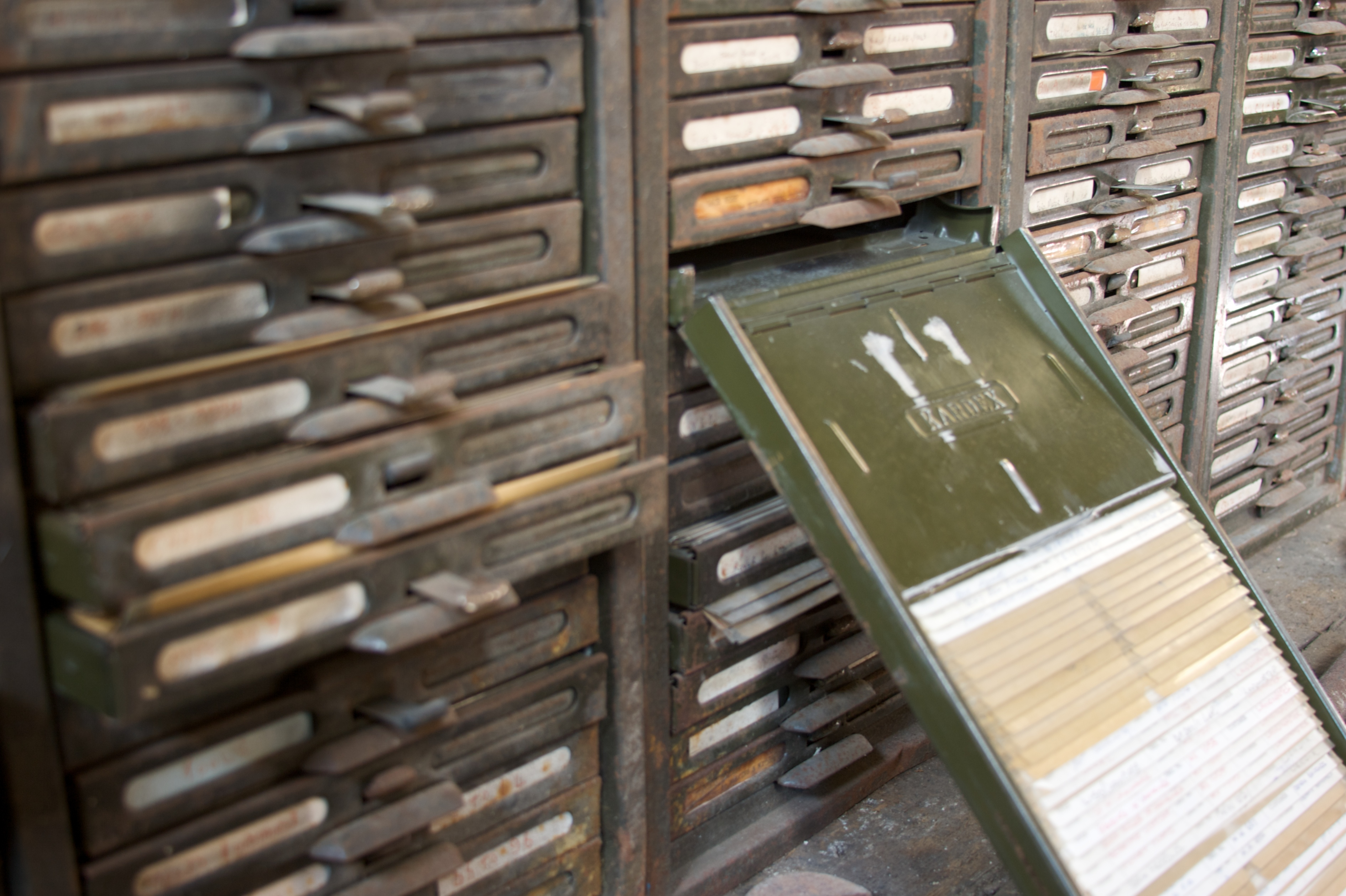
Kardex filing cabinets, 20th century

A visible file or kardex (a generic trademark referring to a prominent purveyor) is a filing system for overlapping cards fixed in shallow drawers.

A version was commercialized by Kardex. The Library Bureau company commercialized the similar L. B. Speedac, while yet another brand was the Index Visible System. The ACME Visual File system was manufactured in Crozet, Virginia.

== See also ==
- Card catalog – Register of bibliographic items
- Card file – System of small items of information stored on paper slips or cards
- Microsoft Cardfile – Software of personal information manager type
- Rolodex – Rotating card file device
