= James Rand Jr. =

American industrialist (1886–1968)

- Rand in 1937
- Born: November 18, 1886; North Tonawanda, New York, US
- Died: June 3, 1968 (aged 81); Freeport, Bahamas
- Education: Harvard University
- Occupation: Businessperson
- Years active: 1908-1958
- Employer(s): American Kardex, Rand Ledger Corporation, Remington Rand, Sperry-Rand
- Spouse(s): Miriam Smith Rand (d. 1927); Evelyn Huber Rand (d. 1934); Dorothy Stevenson Rand (his death)
- Children: Twin sons, one daughter

James Henry Rand Jr. (November 18, 1886 – June 3, 1968) was an American industrialist who revolutionized the business record industry. He founded American Kardex, an office equipment and office supplies firm which later merged with his father's company, the Rand Ledger Corporation. Rand later bought out and merged with several other companies, notably the Remington Typewriter Company, to form Remington Rand. In 1955, Rand merged his corporation with the Sperry Corporation to form Sperry-Rand, one of the earliest and largest computer manufacturing companies in the United States.

== Early years ==
James H. Rand Jr. was born on November 18, 1886, to James and Mary (Jameson Scribner) Rand in North Tonawanda, New York. He was a descendant of John Rand, one of the founders of Charlestown, Massachusetts. His father, James Rand, worked in the banking industry for many years. Realizing that bank clerks had to thumb through large numbers of index cards for information, James Rand Sr. invented the first commercial system of dividers, file tabs and index cards and founded the Rand Ledger Company to manufacture the index system.

James H. Rand Jr. graduated from high school and received a bachelor's degree in 1908 from Harvard University. He joined his father's company, and quickly rose through the ranks of management. In 1910, he married Miriam Smith.

== Rand Ledger and American Kardex ==
James Rand Sr. fell seriously ill in 1910. At his father's wish, James H. Rand Jr. assumed control of the Rand Ledger Company from 1910 to 1914. Rand Sr. resumed control of the company in 1915. However, James Rand Jr. soon clashed with his father over his proposal to undertake a million dollar advertising campaign to boost company sales. "Get out and make a living and don't ask me for a dollar!" the elder Rand is reported to have said. James Rand Jr. left Rand Ledger in 1915. He borrowed $10,000 from his uncle (a bank trustee) and formed his own filing and index supply company, American Kardex, later that year.

Within five years, American Kardex grew to be one of the leading office supply companies in the United States. It was roughly equal in revenues to Rand Ledger, and the two companies easily dominated the American office supply market. In 1920, American Kardex had more than $1 million in gross sales. The company's products were widely used in the health care field ("filling a Kardex" became common nomenclature for entering data into a patient's medical record), and demand in Europe was so strong that Rand soon built a factory in Germany. In 1921, James Rand Jr. founded the Kardex Institute to collect and disseminate information on good business record-keeping and filing practices, hiring expert statistician Karl G. Karsten as president and general manager.

== Remington Rand ==
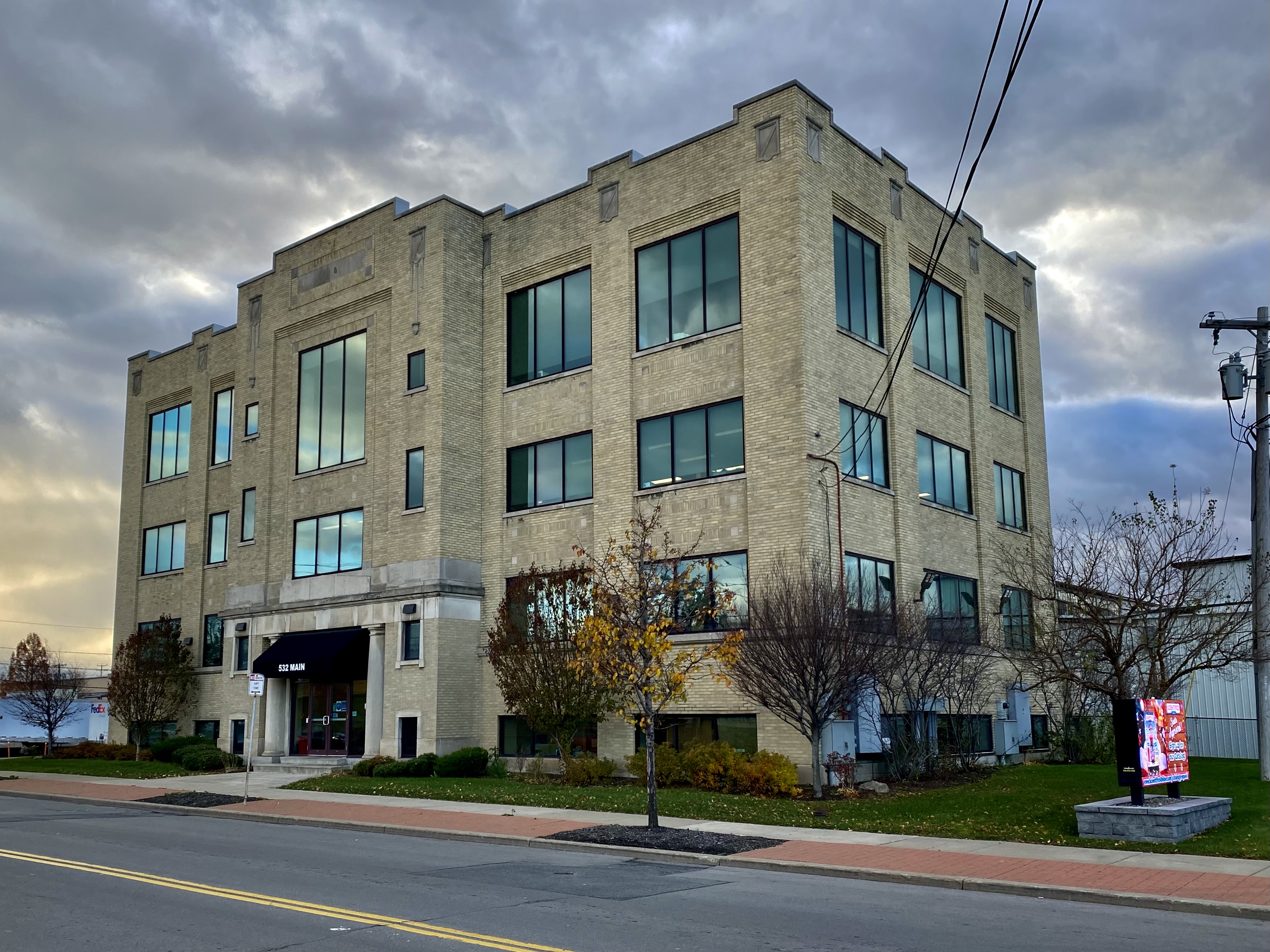
The American Kardex complex in Tonawanda was built in 1923, served as its corporate headquarters until the merger with Remington in 1927, and continued to be operated by Remington Rand's Kardex Division until the early 1960s.

=== Early years ===
As competition between American Kardex and Rand Ledger intensified, Mary Rand brokered a reconciliation between father and son. In 1925, the two men agreed that American Kardex should purchase Rand Ledger. The new company, Rand Kardex, was the largest office supply company in the United States. James Rand Sr. became the company chairman, while James Rand Jr. was its president and general manager.

Rand published his thoughts on business in a book, Assuring Business Profits, or How to Run Any Business on a Big Business Basis.

James Rand Jr. soon took the company on a buying spree. The company became the largest supplier of office furniture in the world through its 1926 acquisition of Globe Wernicke Co., but was forced to divest itself of the business later that year after an antitrust action. Between 1927 and 1929, the company merged with or bought out a number of companies, including Index Visible, Inc. (which had been founded by Yale University economist Irving Fisher), Safe-Cabinet Co. (which had invented the fire-proof safe), Library Bureau, Inc. (which had invented the filing cabinet), Dalton Adding Machine and Baker-Vawter Ledger. For a brief time in 1926, the company was known as Rand Kardex Bureau, Inc. In 1927, James Rand Jr. merged his company with the Remington Typewriter Co. (which had invented the noiseless and electric typewriters) and changed its name to Remington Rand. Company sales grew from $5 million in 1927 to $500 million in 1954.

James Rand, Jr.'s wife, Miriam, died in 1927. He married the former Evelyn Huber in 1929.

Rand was named chairman of Remington Rand in 1929. He retained that post and added the title of president in 1931.

The Great Depression hit Remington Rand very hard. By 1931, company revenues were just a quarter their pre-depression levels, and the company would not begin to recover until 1936. Rand became active in efforts to strengthen the U.S. economy. He co-founded the Committee for the Nation in January 1933 with Frank A. Vanderlip, former president of the National City Bank of New York. The Committee was dedicated to getting the United States off the gold standard and re-inflating the dollar. The Committee for the Nation was highly influential. It succeeded in persuading President Franklin D. Roosevelt to demonetize the dollar and abandon the gold standard in 1933. Rand's influence in national economic affairs led him to be consulted several times by the federal government on policies to help the nation emerge from the depression.

Rand's second wife, Evelyn, died in June 1934.

In 1935, James Rand Jr. was accused by the Securities and Exchange Commission of stock manipulation. Rand signed a consent decree in late May 1935 in which he did not admit guilt but did agree to stop stock purchases which would manipulate the share price of Remington Rand. In 1937, Rand founded the electric shaver division of Remington Rand.

=== Remington Rand strike of 1936–1937 ===
Rand personally became involved in a major strike action at Remington Rand's plants in 1936. At one point, Rand had enjoyed favorable relations with the labor movement in the United States, winning praise for his economic policies from American Federation of Labor President William Green. But then Remington Rand's workers began unionizing in 1934. A strike that year led to a contract and recognition for the union. Rand ordered company managers to harass the union in an attempt to drive it from the plants. In the spring of 1936, rumors spread that the company would close plants in upstate New York. Receiving no reassurances from management, the union struck on May 25, 1936. Rand personally directed many aspects of the strike, including the extensive use of strikebreakers, labor spies, incendiary public statements, the formation of company unions and "citizens' committees" to undermine union support, and more. The Remington Rand strike of 1936–1937 was a particularly long and violent one. Many of the tactics ordered by James Rand Jr. were documented by the National Labor Relations Board in its 120-page decision in Remington Rand, Inc., 2 NLRB 626 (decided March 13, 1937). Just a month into the strike, Rand published "the Mohawk Valley formula"—his personal prescription for breaking strikes and unions. The NLRB called it "a battle plan for industrial war."

As the strike wound down, Rand and his hired strikebreaker Pearl Bergoff were both indicted by a federal grand jury for violating the Byrnes Act. The Byrnes Act banned the interstate transportation of personnel for the purpose of breaking strikes. Both men were acquitted seven months later, but the United States Attorney in the case claimed Rand won acquittal only after suppressing evidence which would have led to his conviction. Four years later, the NLRB asked a federal court to have James Rand Jr. held in contempt of court for continuing to obstruct court-ordered implementation of the NLRB's order forcing the company to recognize and bargain with the union. The charge was dropped when the company relented and began implementing the order.

=== Legal troubles and World War II ===
As the 1930s drew to a close, James Rand Jr. encountered a number of legal difficulties. In July 1939, he along with the top executives of three other typewriter manufacturing companies were personally sued by the U.S. Department of Justice for antitrust violations. Rand was again cited by the Securities and Exchange Commission for stock manipulation in October 1939. In November 1939, Remington Rand shareholders sued Rand and other top corporate executives for their lavish spending on perks and other items.

During World War II, Rand transformed the Remington Rand company into a major defense contractor. The company manufactured parts and weapons for the U.S. military, including bomb fuses, the Norden bombsight and the M1911 pistol.

In 1944, James Rand Sr. died.

=== Post-war years ===
The post-war years led to continued rapid company expansion under James Rand, Jr.'s leadership. The Remington Rand plant at Elmira, New York, became the largest business machine manufacturing plant in the world. Wishing to build on the company's expertise in business machines and showing remarkable foresight, Rand pushed the company into purchasing the Eckert–Mauchly Computer Corporation in 1950. Founders J. Presper Eckert and John Mauchly had conceived and designed the world's first purely electronic, Turing-complete, digital computer in 1946. They founded Eckert–Mauchly in 1947, and developed the BINAC computer shortly thereafter. Remington Rand purchased the company in March 1950.

Under Rand, the company recovered rapidly from its Depression-era difficulties. Sales grew from $5 million in 1927 to $500 million in 1954.

Remington Rand merged with the Sperry Corporation on July 1, 1955. At the age of 68, James Rand Jr. became the company's vice chairman.

== Retirement and death ==
In 1958, James Rand Jr. was 72 years old. On April 15, 1958, Rand announced that he would step down from his various roles in the company. He was succeeded as president by Kenneth R. Herman.

Yet, Rand's legal troubles were not yet over. In 1965, the Internal Revenue Service sued him for $35 million in back taxes.

Rand and his third wife, the former Dorothy Stevenson, retired to The Bahamas. He donated significant sums of money to Princess Margaret Hospital in Nassau, and to the Harvard School of Public Health.

James Rand Jr. died in Freeport in 1968 at the age of 81. He was survived by his wife, Dorothy, his twin sons and his daughter.

== Speedboats ==
Aside from his career as a businessman, James Rand Jr. was also a patron of speedboats. In the 1920s, Rand sponsored the "Spitfire" design, which won numerous races. In 1927, Rand won the "Duke of York Cup," a powerboat racing trophy.

Rand's passion for powerboating later helped save three lives. While Rand was powerboating in Long Island Sound in 1939, he encountered a small boat which had capsized. The three women who had occupied the boat were near drowning when Rand's boat came upon the wreck. Rand himself, at the age of 53, leapt into the water and helped pull the women to safety. The press lauded Rand for personally saving the three women's lives.

== See also ==
- Tonawanda Kardex Lumbermen

== Sources ==
- "Asks to Have Rand Held in Contempt." New York Times. July 2, 1941.
- Barry, James. American Powerboats. St. Paul, Minn.: MBI Publishing, 2003. ISBN 0-7603-1466-7
- Bratter, Hebert M. "The Committee for the Nation: A Case History in Monetary Propaganda." Journal of Political Economy. 49:4 (August 1941).
- "Change In Remington Rand." New York Times. July 16, 1931.
- "Computer Unit Sold to Remington Rand." New York Times. March 2, 1950.
- Cortada, James W. Historical Dictionary of Data Processing. Westport, Ct.: Greenwood Press, 1987. ISBN 0-313-25651-9
- "Denial By J.H. Rand Jr." New York Times. May 26, 1935.
- Drew, Jacqueline A. and Blumberg, Mark S. "What Happens to Medication Orders?" American Journal of Nursing. 62:7 (July 1962).
- "Ex-Head of Rand Corp. Sued for $35 Million Tax." Associated Press. January 13, 1965.
- "41 Leaders Called for Trade Planning." New York Times. June 22, 1933.
- "Glossary. History at the Department of Labor." U.S. Department of Labor. No date. Accessed March 1, 2007.
- "Government Wins Rand Kardex Suit." New York Times. December 10, 1926.
- "Green Hails Rand Plan." New York Times. October 6, 1932.
- Ingham, John N. Biographical Dictionary of American Business Leaders. Westport, Ct.: Greenwood Press, 1983. ISBN 0-313-21362-3
- "J.H. Rand Jr. Rescues 3 Women From Capsized Boat in Sound." New York Times. August 22, 1939.
- ".H. Rand Sr. Dead." New York Times. September 17, 1944.
- "James Henry Rand Dead At 81." New York Times. June 4, 1968.
- "Manipulation Ban Put on J.H. Rand Jr." New York Times. October 19, 1939.
- "Merger Discussions Announced By Sperry and Remington Rand." New York Times. March 17, 1955.
- "Misconduct Laid to Rand Officials." New York Times. May 25, 1935.
- "Miss Spitfire V Sets Two Records." Associated Press. July 7, 1927.
- "Mrs. James H. Rand." New York Times. June 9, 1934.
- "Mrs. Rand Brings Speed-Boat Trophy." New York Times. August 23, 1927.
- "Office Equipment Makers to Merge." New York Times. February 10, 1927.
- Rand, James H. Jr. Assuring Business Profits, or How to Run Any Business on a Big Business Basis. New York: B.C. Forbes, 1926
- "Rand and Bergoff Indicted by Federal Jury For Putting Strike-Breakers in Middletown." New York Times. April 13, 1937.
- "Rand, Bergoff and Chowderhead." Time. December 7, 1936.
- "Rand Challenges Complaint by SEC." New York Times. October 20, 1939.
- "Rand in Command." Time. July 27, 1931.
- "Rand-Kardex Merger." New York Times. March 28, 1925.
- "Rand Stockholders Win Right to Sue." New York Times. November 30, 1939.
- "Rand Yields the Helm at Remington." New York Times. April 16, 1958.
- "Remington Rand Approves Merger." New York Times. May 28, 1955.
- "Remington Rand Resumes Common Dividend With First Quarterly Payment Since 1931." New York Times. April 22, 1936.
- "Remington Rand's Directors." Associated Press. June 15, 1927.
- Rothbard, Murray N. America's Great Depression. Auburn, Ala.: Ludwig Von Mises Institute, 2000. ISBN 0-945466-05-6
- Shaplen, Joseph. "Lawyers Says Rand Blocked Evidence." New York Times. November 10, 1937.
- Shaplen, Joseph. "Rand Acquitted of Strikebreaking." New York Times. November 19, 1937.
- "Speed-Boat Record Pilot to Seek Duke of York Cup." New York Times. July 15, 1927.
- "Thomas Asks Halt on Stabilization." New York Times. December 14, 1933.
- "Typewriter 'Trust' Charged, 4 Indicted." New York Times. July 29, 1939.
- "U.S. Alleges Trust in Office Fittings." New York Times. October 22, 1926.
- Weber, Tommy. "Rands Donate to Bahamas Hospital." New York Times. August 17, 1963.
