= Karl G. Karsten =

American economist (1891– 1968)

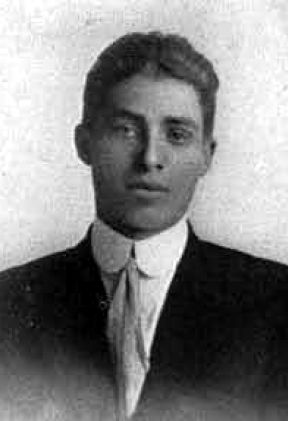
Karl G. Karsten, 1910

Karl Gustaf Karsten (1891– May 25, 1968) was an American economist, statistician, businessman, inventor and author, known from his seminal work on graphical methods, and economic forecasting.

== Life and work ==
Born in Bloomington, Indiana to Gustaf E. Karsten (1859–1908), a West Prussian-born professor of German literature at Indiana University and University of Illinois and founder of the Journal of English and Germanic Philology, and Eleanor S. (Daggett) Karsten (1872–1946), a suffragette and secretary to Jane Addams at Hull House. Karsten received his education as an economist and statistician. He was a student at the University of Illinois in 1907–1908, and at the University of Chicago in 1908–1909, and obtained his BA from the University of New Mexico in 1911 and from Oxford University in 1914 on a Rhodes Scholarship. From 1914 to 1916 he was graduate student at the Columbia University.

Karsten started his career as a newspaper reporter and publicity agent in New York City in 1916. The next year he settled down as an independent consulting statistician, founding the Karsten Statistical Laboratory in New Haven, Connecticut. As a statistician Karsten also specialized in unemployment remedies. In 1926, he became president and general manager of the Kardex Institute, a company founded in 1921 by James Rand, Jr. to collect and disseminate information on good business record-keeping and filing practices. In the late 1920s Karsten founded the Karsten Forecasts, Inc. in New Haven, and early 1930s the Irving Fisher Index Number Institute with Irving Fisher also in New Haven, CT. From 1934 to 1942 he was appointed to multiple agencies in the Federal Government in the Roosevelt Administration.

Karsten had joined the Liberal Club of New York and the Anti-Militarism League in the 1910s. In 1917 he married his first wife Elinor Cox, and they had a daughter together. In the 1920s the Karstens built a summer cottage out in Far Rockaway where they invited Henry Miller and his family to stay in the summer of 1925. Later, he married Helen Tippy.

== Work ==
Since the 1920s Karsten published a series of works on charts and graphs and economic forecasting. He also he invented and patented several information processing devices.

=== Charts and Graphs, 1923 ===
In the 1910s charts and graphs had become a prominent subject in the theoretical discussion of methodology in the social sciences, and Karsten was one of the first to publish a book solely on this topic. Karsten (1923) explained:

In and since the [First World] War the use and developments of charts has been almost phenomenal — so large, indeed, that one able economist who is interested in such things think that we as a country have gone chart-mad. But the development has not been confined to this country, and it has a very solid base in practical utility. There is little question that the chart represents a genuine saving in time and mental effort.

In 1923 he published his best-known work, Charts and Graphs: An Introduction to Graphic Methods in the Control and Analysis of Statistics. This work was especially focussed on statistics, and years ahead of its time.

It the 1910s statistics and graphs were introduced in production control and management in the US and in Britain. Karsten's work, over 700 page and 500 illustrations, was designed for educational purposes and not as handbook for businessmen. In Britain it inspired Thomas Gerald Rose (1886–1963), who had published since the 1930s on higher control in management, management accounting and business charts.

=== The Theory of Quadrature in Economics, 1924/26 ===
In his 1924 "Theory of Quadrature in Economics" Karsten "showed a detailed understanding of how some economic time series could be generated as partial sums of others and that there could, therefore, be a pair of series where one was the cumulation of the other." The basic idea of this quadrature was described by Karsten:

Two forces are said by Mr. Edge to be in quadrature when they trace curves such that the fluctuations of one of the curves correspond to the fluctuations of a curve of the integration or cumulation of the data of the other curve. When a cause-and-effect relation exists between such two phenomena, the first may then be said to be cumulatively affected by the second.

Furthermore:

The quadrature method therefore applies cumulation to obtain a series representing the integral function, and differencing to obtain a series of data representing the derivative.

Karsten suggested in this theory that "the aim of correlation analysis should ultimately be the recovery of causal connections." The next year Jan Tinbergen confirmed this claim by Karsten in an ongoing discussion.

Boumans (2004) recalls, that "Karsten ... had touched 'not without merit' on the problem of causal relations, had shown the existence of cumulative relations between the three Harvard barometer indices, which he interpreted as causal relationships. In the first place, he found, using correlation analysis, that the cumulative values of the Harvard B-index parallel those of the Harvard A- index, with a lag of 3 ... Second, he found the empirical relationship that the C-index was a cumulative of bot the A and B indices ... Thus according to Karsten (1926:417), the B-index was the 'generating force' of the three; the other two indices depended upon, and were derived from, changes in the business index."

=== Scientific forecasting, 1931 ===
Karsten founded Karsten Statistical Laboratory in New Haven, Connecticut to develop so-called "barometers", to theoretically forecast business conditions. Lhabitant (2011) explained that these forecasts included "barometers of volume of trade, of building activity, of interest rates, of the wholesale price level, of indices of certain industries, of railroad stocks, of public utility stocks, of steel stocks, of oil stocks, of automobile stocks, and of store stocks."

His 1931 Scientific forecasting was based on Karsten's experience as stock market analyst, and was written as a handbook for stockbrokers. This work on scientific forecasting focussed on the methods and application to practical business and to stock market operations, and relied on the techniques of economic barometers.

According to Keuzenkamp (1987) "Karsten was fairly optimistic about his abilities to make prognoses, but, as he had to admit, 'at the present time this investigation can not account for economic changes which are wholly due to the element of mob-, crowd- or herd-psychology'. In general, however, Karsten's conclusion is that these psychological factors are relatively unimportant, which leads him to find reason to state that his results support "economic determinism". There is only one exception: the stock market. Of course it is not surprising that Karsten was moderate with claims about stock market prediction, so shortly after the generally unexpected crash of 1929."

== Selected publications ==
Books

- Karsten, Karl G. Charts and graphs: An introduction to graphic methods in the control and analysis of statistics. Prentice-Hall, 1923, 1925.
  - Review by: William Fielding Ogburn. American Journal of Sociology, Vol. 30, No. 1 (Jul., 1924), pp. 98-99. <https://www.jstor.org/stable/2764959>
  - Review by: R. von Huhn. Journal of the American Statistical Association, Vol. 20, No. 149 (Mar., 1925), pp. 153-156. <https://doi.org/10.2307/2277457>
- Karsten, Karl G. Scientific forecasting; its methods and application to practical business and to stock market operations. New York, Greenberg. 1931.

Articles, a selection:

- Karsten, Karl G. "The theory of quadrature in economics." Journal of the American Statistical Association 19.145 (1924): 14–29. <https://doi.org/10.2307/2277255>
- Karsten, Karl G. "The Harvard Business Indexes—A New Interpretation." Journal of the American Statistical Association. 21.156 (1926): 399–418. <https://doi.org/10.2307/2276977>

== Patents ==
Patents, a selection:

- Karsten, Karl G. "Information-dispensing set." U.S. Patent No. 1,537,640. 12 May 1925.
- Karsten, Karl G. "Package for dates, figs, candies, and like products," U.S. Patent No. 1,556,608. 13 Oct. 1925.
- Karsten, Karl G. "Map," U.S. Patent No. 1,556,609. 13 Oct. 1925.
- Karsten, Karl G. "Centrifugal machine," U.S. Patent No. 1,575,846. 9 Mar. 1926.
- Karsten, Karl G. "Tridimensional chart." U.S. Patent No. 1,700,318. 29 Jan. 1929.
- Karsten, Karl G. "Radio Program Detector" U.S. Patent No. 1,752,302. 1 Apr. 1930.
