= Kardex Group =

Storage company in Switzerland

Kardex Holding AG
- Kardex Group logo, 21st century
- Formerly: Rand Ledger; American Kardex; Rand Kardex Bureau; Remington Rand; Kardex Systems
- ISIN: CH0100837282
- Founded: 1977
- Headquarters: Zurich, Switzerland
- Key people: Jens Hardenacke (CEO); Thomas Reist (CFO)
- Revenue: €850,4 million (2025)
- Number of employees: 2,900
- Website: www.kardex.com

Kardex Holding AG, headquartered in Zurich, Switzerland, specializes in automated storage and retrieval systems, integrated material handling, small parts storage, and automated high-bay warehouses for modern warehouses in a variety of industries. Employing around 2,900 people across 30+ countries, Kardex Holding AG has been listed on the SIX Swiss Exchange since 1989.

== History ==
Kardex has been a significant name in business data storage since 1898, tracing back to the Rand Ledger Company. The brand became closely linked to the widespread adoption of the index card as a standard tool for business data management, reflecting its role in the evolution of information organization and retrieval systems throughout the 20th century.

Kardex as a company name was introduced in 1915, subsumed in 1927 (it remained as a brand name and a division name), and revived in 1977.

== Separate Rand-led companies (1898–1925) ==
=== Rand Ledger (1898–1925) ===
American Ledger was founded by James H. Rand, Sr. in 1898. Rand had been a banker for many years and had come to see that existing index card systems used by clerks were inefficient. What was needed was a rationalized system using dividers, file tabs, and labels. Rand Sr. invented an improved filing system based on these concepts and founded the Rand Ledger Company to manufacture his index system, called the Visible Ledger.

James Rand, Jr. joined his father's company after being graduated from Harvard University in 1908 and ran it from 1910 through 1914. In 1915 the elder Rand re-assumed control of the company and Rand Jr., unable to reach agreement with his father on business matters, left.

=== American Kardex (1915–1925) ===
James Rand, Jr. formed his own filing and index supply company, American Kardex, in 1915. Within five years, American Kardex grew to be one of the leading office supply companies in the United States. It was roughly equal in revenues to Rand Ledger, and the two companies easily dominated the American office supply market. In 1920, American Kardex had more than $1 million in gross sales. The company's products were widely used in the health care field ("filling a kardex" became a common term for entering data into a patient's medical record), and demand in Europe was so strong that Rand soon built a factory in Germany.

== Rand Kardex Bureau (1925–1927) ==
As competition between American Kardex and Rand Ledger intensified, Mary Rand (James H. Rand, Sr.'s wife and James Rand, Jr.'s mother) brokered a reconciliation between father and son. In 1925, the two men agreed that American Kardex should purchase Rand Ledger. The new company, Rand Kardex, was the largest office supply company in the United States. James Rand, Sr. became the company chairman, while James Rand, Jr. was its president and general manager.

James Rand Jr. soon began expanding the company through acquisitions. He bought companies including Index Visible, Safe-Cabinet, Dalton Adding Machine, Baker-Vawter Ledger, and Library Bureau (founded in 1876 by Melvil Dewey), which was probably the first company to sell filing cabinets commercially (around 1900) and may have invented them.

In its brief existence, the company was first known as Rand Kardex and then, after the acquisition of Library Bureau, as Rand Kardex Bureau.

== Remington Rand (1927–1955) ==
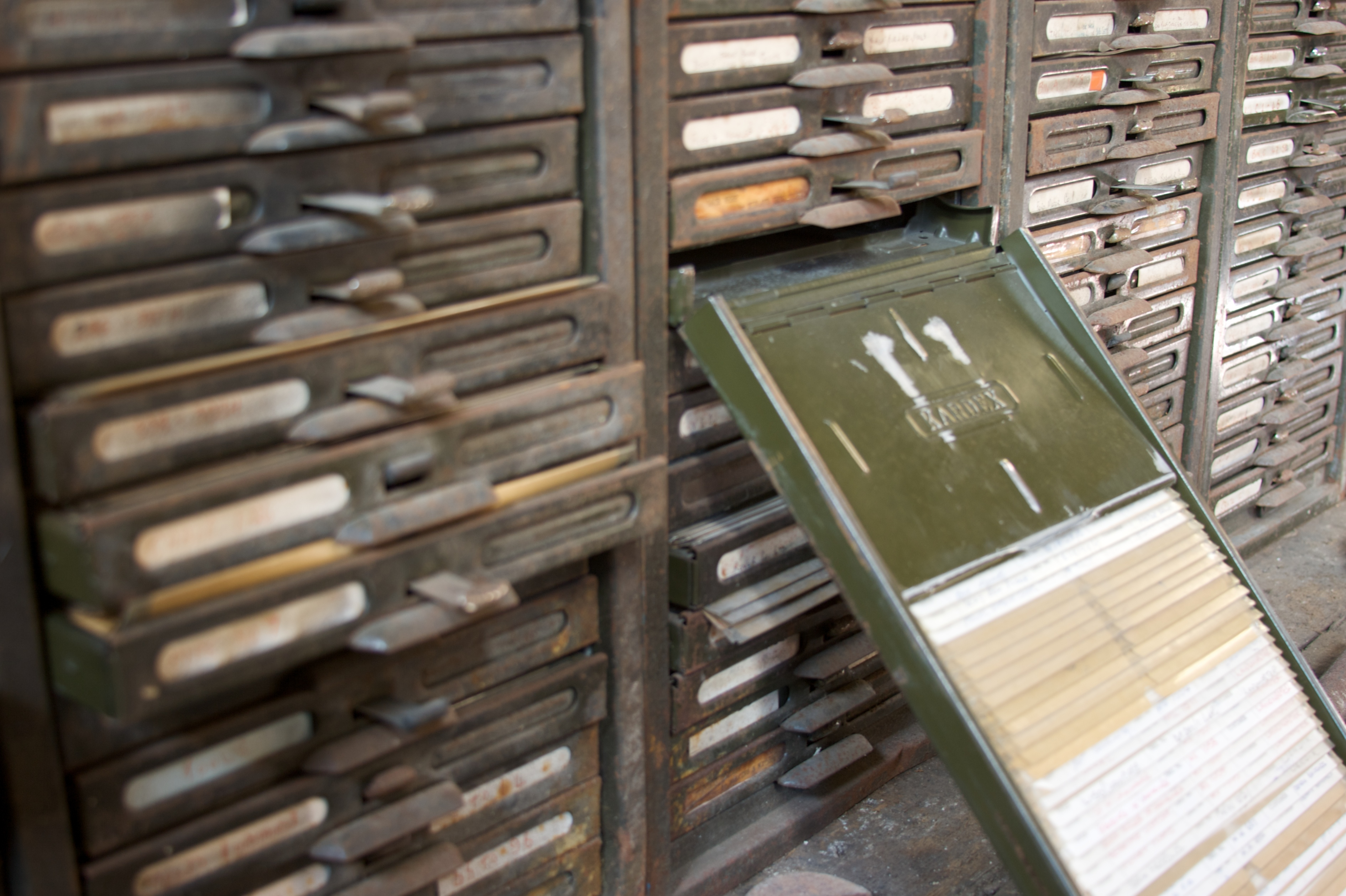
Kardex visible file cabinets, 20th century

In 1886, E. Remington and Sons sold its typewriter business and the rights to the Remington name to the Standard Typewriter Manufacturing Company which in 1902 changed its name to Remington Typewriter Company. In 1927 Rand Kardex merged with Remington Typewriter. The new company was called Remington Rand, and Kardex was a division and brand of that company.

Remington Rand was led by James Rand Jr. for the duration of its independent existence. Company sales grew from $5 million in 1927 to $500 million in 1954, although market share suffered in the face of competition from IBM.

Remington Rand purchased the Eckert–Mauchly Computer Corporation in 1950, delivered the UNIVAC I in 1951, and bought Engineering Research Associates in 1952, all this making them a major player in the new computer industry.

== Sperry Rand (1955–1978) ==
In 1955, Sperry Corporation acquired Remington Rand and renamed itself Sperry Rand. Remington Rand remained as a separate brand name and in the name of some divisions. The Remington Rand Systems division was concerned with filing systems and associated products such as file folders, and other material and physical data storage and handling systems, including Kardex.

In 1978 Sperry Rand decided to concentrate on the computer business, and sold a number of divisions including Remington Rand Systems. (Remington Rand Machines was also sold along with some other divisions, and the company dropped "Rand" from its title and reverted to Sperry Corporation; in 1986 they merged with Burroughs Corporation to form Unisys.)

== Kardex Systems (1978–2008) ==
The Remington Rand Systems division of Sperry Rand, now based in Marietta, Ohio, was acquired by Aarque Management Corporation of Jamestown, New York, and renamed to Kardex Systems to reflect Kardex's status as a long-famous brand in filing systems.

In 2003 the company was sold to RACK Enterprises and Ronald Miller was made president.

Miller established a separate company, Randex, also selling filing and storage system components, for operation in Europe. Randex continued to exist as a separate company under Miller family control after Kardex Systems was sold to Remstar.

In 2008 Kardex Systems was acquired by Kardex AG of Zurich, Switzerland. Kardex AG had been founded in 1977 (although what is now its Kardex Mlog division had been established in 1922 as Mehne GmbH) and its American subsidiary, Remstar, established in 1981 in Westbrook, Maine.

== Kardex Group (2008– ) ==
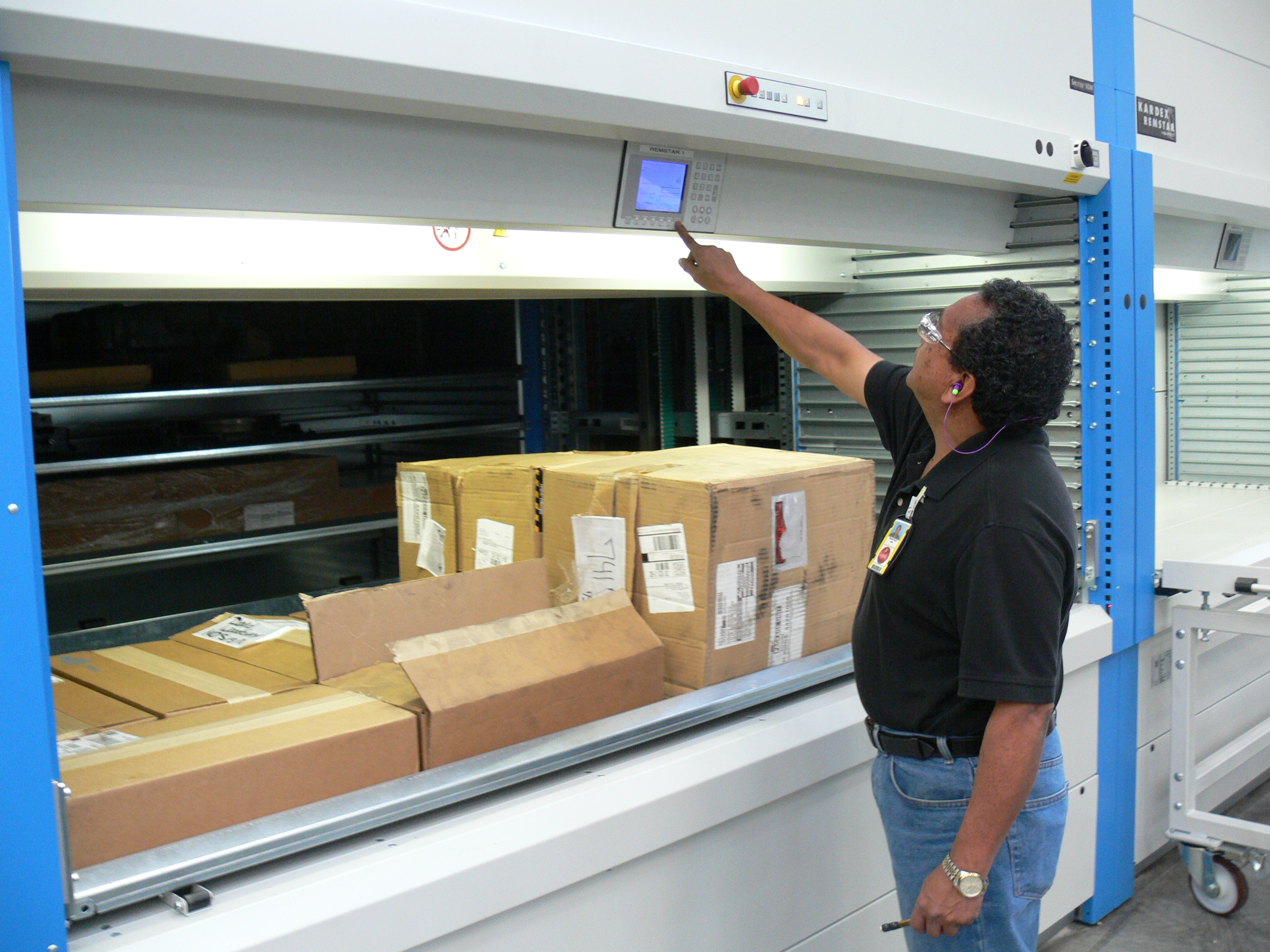
Kardex Remstar vertical storage carousel in use

In 2009, Kardex Holding AG incorporated Kardex US into their existing US operation, Remstar, which had been established in 1981 based in Westbrook.

In 2010, MLOG Logistics GmbH was acquired by Kardex Holding AG and integrated into the Kardex Group. Kardex Mlog has its origins in the steel construction company Erwin Mehne KG, which was founded in Heilbronn in 1922 and initially specialized in steel construction and bridge building. From 1968, the former Mehne GmbH also offered complete automated high-bay warehouses. In 1989, the company was taken over by MAN and operated as MAN Logistics GmbH. In 2005 the company was sold in a management buy-out. The company, now trading as MLOG Logistics GmbH, subsequently expanded throughout the European market. In 2009, production and administration were relocated to the current site in Neuenstadt am Kocher, Germany. In 2010, MLOG Logistics GmbH was acquired by Kardex Holding AG and integrated into the Kardex Group.

In 2020, Kardex acquired a stake in the start-up company Rocket Solution GmbH, based in Unterhaching near Munich. The company develops standardized automated storage and retrieval systems consisting of dynamic storage and retrieval vehicles, known as Rocket Shuttles, which move within the racks and deliver containers and trays to the system interfaces. In 2025, Kardex acquired a controlling majority in Rocket Solution

In 2021, Kardex Remstar opened its new factory in West Columbia, USA, the first factory outside of Germany, where it operates manufacturing facilities in Bellheim and Neuburg.

In 2021, the Kardex Group became a global AutoStore™ partner.

== Business Units ==
=== Kardex Remstar ===
Kardex Remstar is a manufacturer of automated storage and retrieval systems small-sized inventory. Remstar has a global presence with more than 30 subsidiaries and representative offices, offering customers comprehensive service and support in addition to its automated storage and retrieval systems. The company generated sales of €572.8 million with 2'200 employees in 2025. Kardex Remstar has production facilities in Neuburg an der Kammel and Bellheim, Germany, and in West Columbia, South Carolina, USA.

=== Kardex Mlog ===
Kardex Mlog develops, manufactures and maintains integrated material handling systems and automated high-bay warehouses. The company acts as a general contractor and supplier of components and systems from its own production facilities in the fields of new installations, modernization and service. These include storage and retrieval machines up to 45 meters high, conveyor technology and software. With 420 employees, Kardex Mlog achieved a turnover of €115.9 million in the financial year 2025. The company is headquartered in Neuenstadt am Kocher, Germany.

=== Kardex AS Solutions ===
AutoStore offers storage and order-picking for small parts based on autonomous robots. As a global partner, Kardex is involved in the distribution, planning and installation of AutoStore worldwide. Kardex AS Solutions generated revenues of EUR 162,6 million in 2025 with 230 employees.
