= Remington Rand =

American manufacturing company (1927–1955)

Remington Rand, Inc.

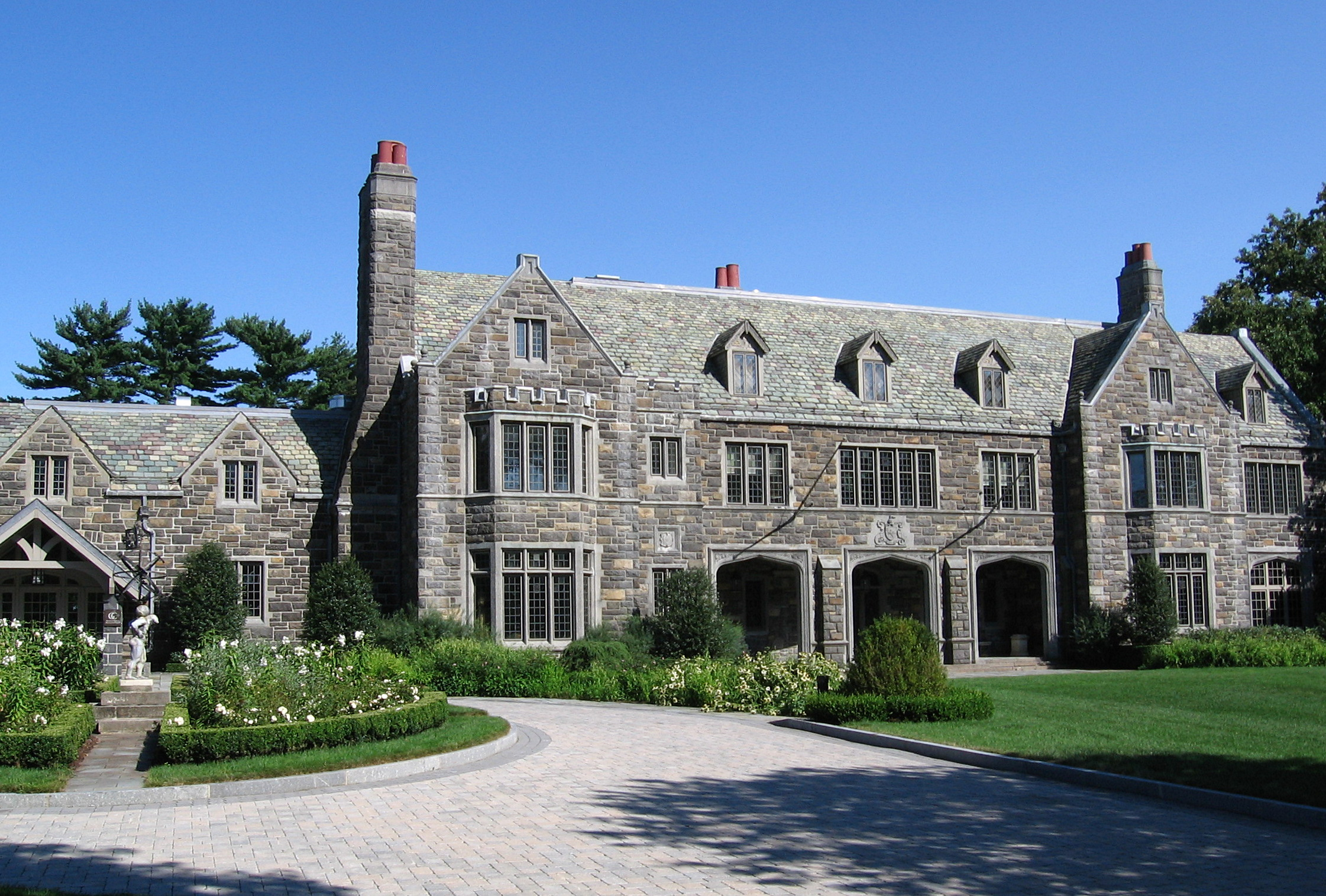
- Rock Ledge estate in Rowayton, Connecticut, company headquarters from 1943 to 1964
- Type: Public
- Industry: Technology
- Predecessors: Remington Typewriter Company; Rand Kardex Corporation
- Founded: 1927; 99 years ago
- Defunct: 1955; 71 years ago
- Fate: Merged with Sperry Corporation in 1955 to become Sperry Rand; latter merged with Burroughs Corporation in 1986 to become Unisys
- Headquarters: New York City
- Products: Typewriters; Computers (UNIVAC); Firearms
- Divisions: Eckert–Mauchly; Remington Products

Remington Rand, Inc., was an early American business machine manufacturer, originally a typewriter manufacturer and in a later incarnation the manufacturer of the UNIVAC line of mainframe computers. Formed in 1927 following a merger, Remington Rand was a diversified conglomerate making other office equipment, electric shavers, etc. The Remington Rand Building at 315 Park Avenue South in New York City is a 20-floor skyscraper completed in 1911. After 1955, Remington Rand had a long series of mergers and acquisitions that eventually resulted in the formation of Unisys.

During World War II, Remington Rand produced M1911 pistols used by the United States Armed Forces.

== History ==
Remington Rand was formed in 1927 by the merger of the Remington Typewriter Company and Rand Kardex Corporation. One of its earliest factories, the former Herschell–Spillman Motor Company Complex, was listed on the National Register of Historic Places in 2013. Within the first year, Remington Rand acquired the Dalton Adding Machine Company, the Powers Accounting Machine Company, the Baker-Vawter Company, and the Kalamazoo Loose Leaf Binder Company. From 1936 to 1937 Remington Rand workers went on strike, which resulted in violence and the loss of jobs.

From 1942 to 1945, Remington Rand was a contract manufacturer of the M1911A1 .45 caliber semi-automatic pistol used by the United States Armed Forces during World War II. Remington Rand produced more M1911A1 pistols than any other wartime manufacturer. Remington Rand ranked 66th among United States corporations in the value of World War II military production contracts.

In 1950, Remington Rand acquired the Eckert–Mauchly Computer Corporation, founded by the makers of the ENIAC, and in 1952, they acquired Engineering Research Associates (ERA), both of which were pioneers in electronic computing. At that time, Remington Rand was one of the biggest computer companies in the United States.

On June 14, 1951, the company's first computer was introduced, the UNIVAC I (Universal Automatic Computer). Many branches of the U.S. military, including the Air Force and the Army, were among the first to use the computers. When companies started to buy the computers, they would leave the computers at the Remington Rand facility since they were so big and bulky. The UNIVAC I was about the size of a one-car garage, and 46 of them were built and sold for $1 million each.

Remington Rand was acquired by Sperry Corporation in 1955 to form Sperry Rand (later shortened to Sperry). However, the brand "Remington Rand" continued as a subdivision for many years. Sperry merged in 1986 with Burroughs to form Unisys.

Remington Rand was a regular co-sponsor of the CBS panel show What's My Line? throughout much of the show's run.

=== Strike of 1936–1937 ===
Remington Rand had a major worker strike between 1936 and 1937 when the company bought the Noiseless Typewriter Company in 1924, and the Noiseless Typewriter Company kept their company name and their workers were getting paid by Remington Rand. Also in the summer of 1936, James Rand Jr. tried to break up the strike by firing union workers and hiring new workers to take their places. Rand Jr. also threatened to close the plant. The strike got so severe that state and local police helped keep the strikers from throwing stones at workers and vehicles.

The strike was started by the Federal Union, which was affiliated with the American Federation of Labor (AFL). James Rand Jr. used the idea of the Mohawk Valley Formula to try to break up the strike. The Mohawk Valley Formula was used to spread propaganda about the union strikes. The propaganda was carried out by spreading rumors and lambasting the union strikers for hurting their families, by having no income for their households since they were out of work. The propaganda was also often used to call the union strikers communists or anarchists, to make the public hate the union strikers.

In 1937, the NLRB decided in favor of the workers, and the board ordered Rand to stop interfering with employees' unions and their right to organize. After the strike ended in the summer 1940, the Middletown plant had closed permanently, leaving 1,200 employees without jobs. There were still legal battles being fought for the employees that were in the strike while the plant was closing. The Middletown plant was run by strikebreakers until the closing of the plant in 1940. Today the building is the home of Stubborn Beauty Brewery.

== Products ==
=== Typewriters ===
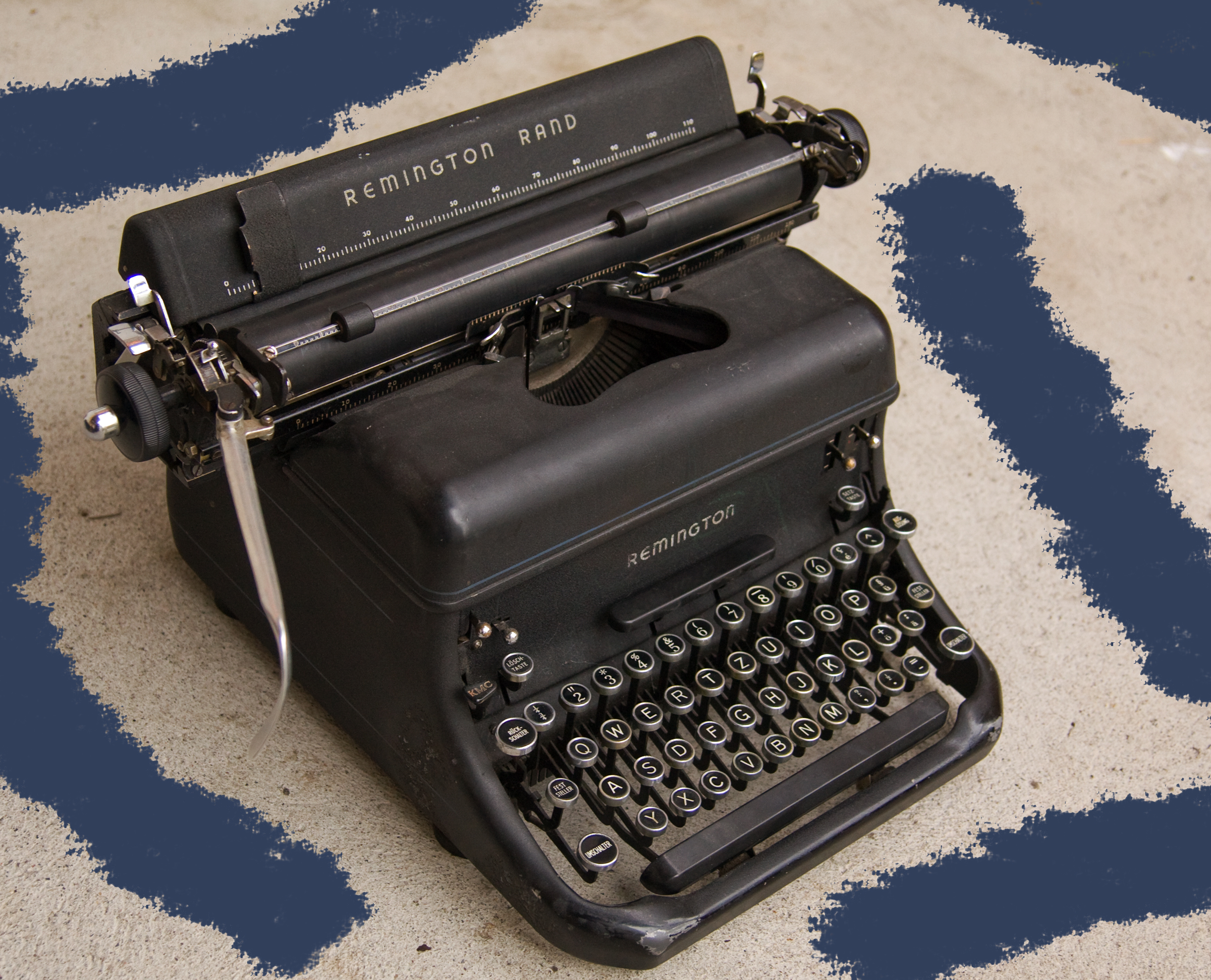
German-model Remington KMC typewriter from 1947

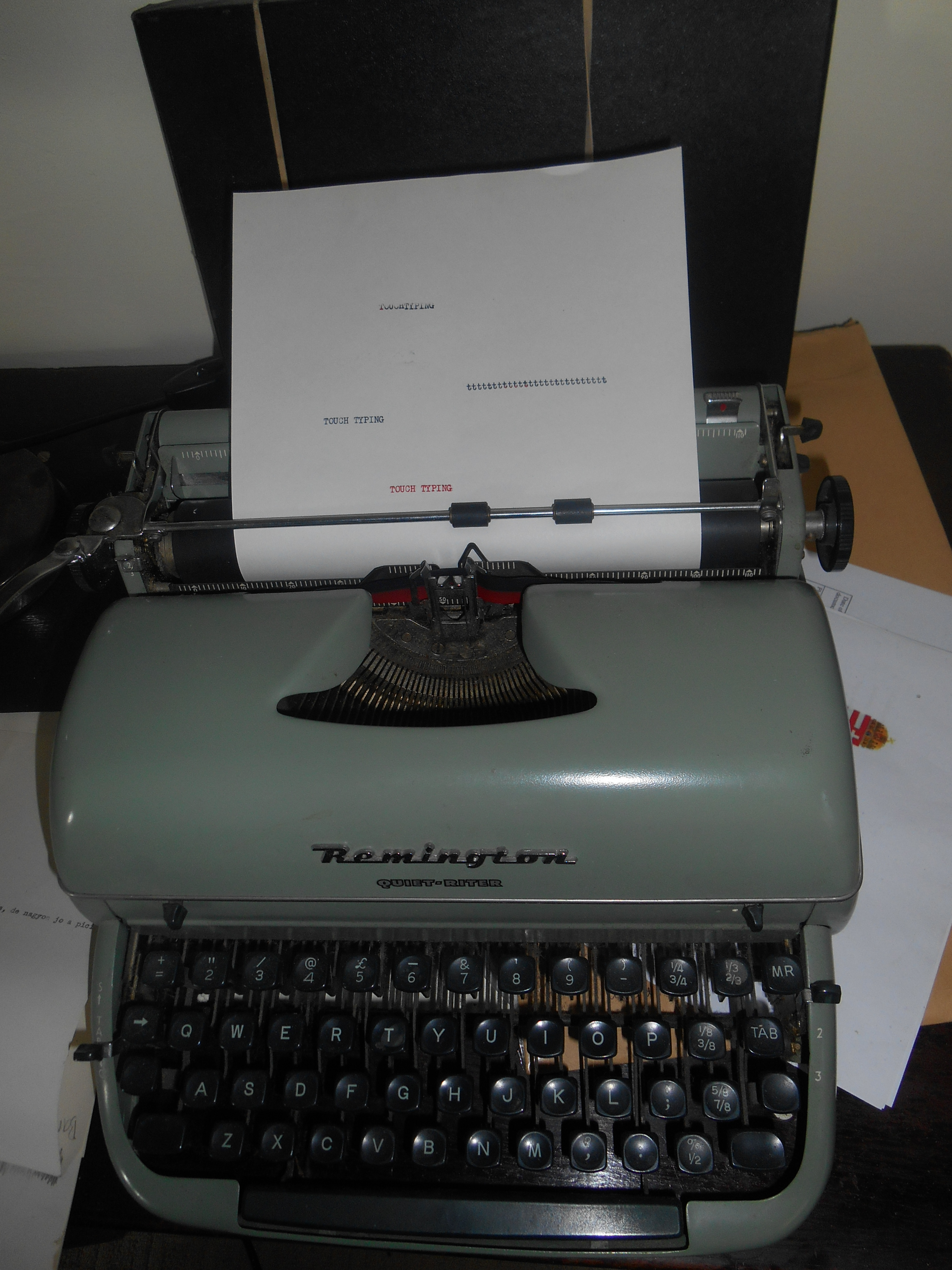
UK-model Remington "Quiet-Riter" from the 1950s

Initially produced by E. Remington and Sons, Remington typewriters were the first to use the QWERTY keyboard layout. Remington had bought the design from its inventor, Christopher Sholes. The Remington No.1 was the first model released. All keys were uppercase. Remington spun off Remington Typewriter Company in 1886, and after the 1927 merger, the Remington Rand Corp. continued to manufacture and sell typewriters.

=== Filing systems ===
Remington Rand sold the Kardex line of card-filing and visible index products, continuing the business of its predecessor Rand Kardex Corporation. The Variadex and Kardex brands were both registered as United States trademarks by Remington Rand in 1939.

=== Colt M1911 ===
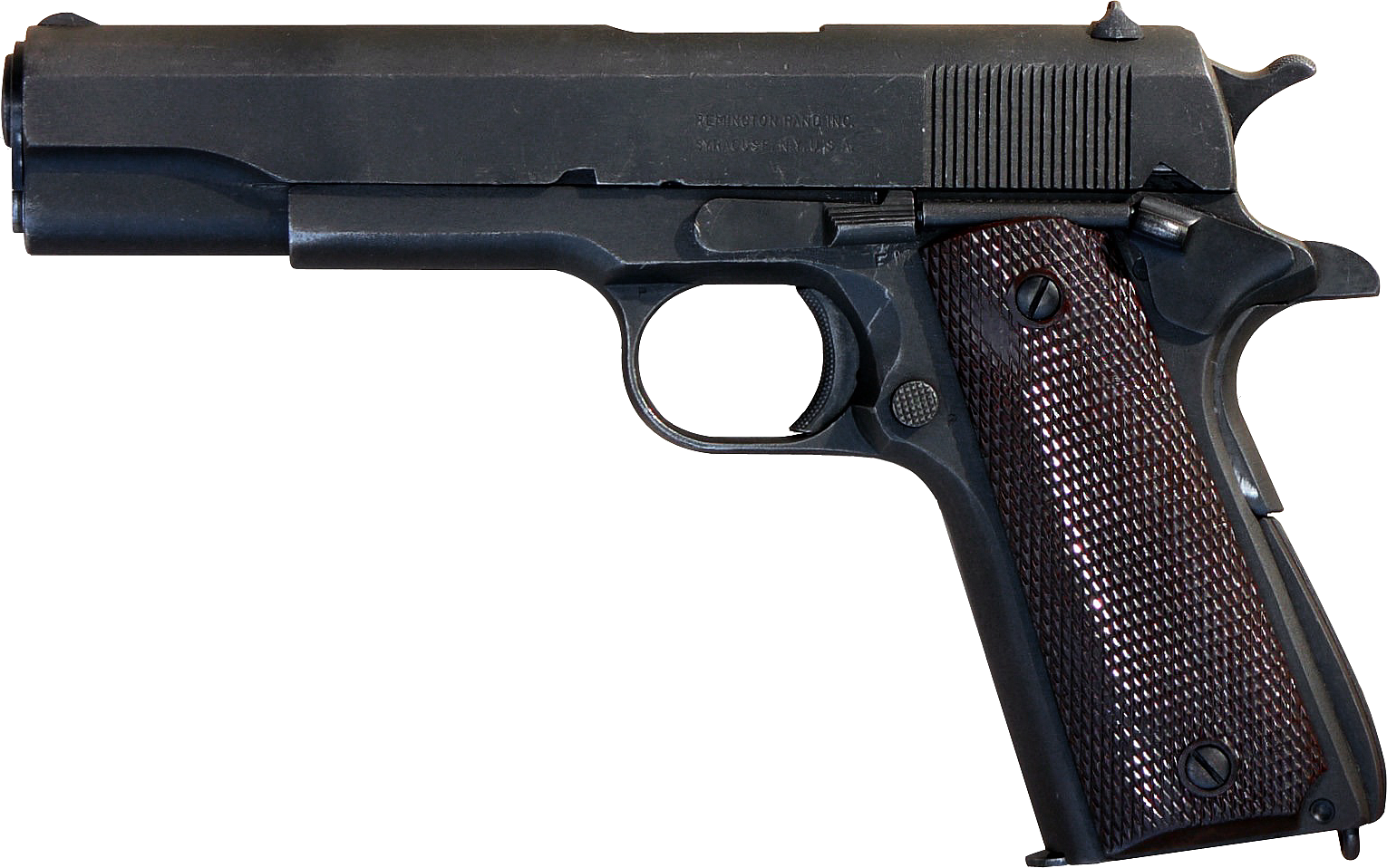
M1911A1 U.S. Army semi-automatic pistol manufactured by Remington Rand

During World War II, Remington Rand produced 958,764 licensed copies of the M1911 pistol for the war effort between 1943 and 1945. These were shipped to the Springfield Armory as each contract was fulfilled. Colt Manufacturing Company was unable to fulfill the demand and was assisted by Remington Rand, Singer Corporation, Union Switch & Signal, Remington Arms and the Ithaca Gun Company. After the war all contracts for the 1911A1 were cancelled.

=== UNIVAC ===
The UNIVAC I (Universal Automatic Computer I) was the second commercial computer made in the United States. It was designed principally by J. Presper Eckert and John Mauchly, the inventors of the ENIAC. Design work was begun by their company, Eckert–Mauchly Computer Corporation, and was completed after the company had been acquired by Remington Rand. (In the years before successor models of the UNIVAC I appeared, the machine was simply known as "the UNIVAC".)

The first UNIVAC was delivered to the United States Census Bureau on March 31, 1951, and was dedicated on June 14 that year. The fifth machine (built for the U.S. Atomic Energy Commission) was used by CBS to predict the result of the 1952 U.S. presidential election. With a sample of 1% of the voting population it predicted Eisenhower's win.

In 1949, Remington Rand designed the Remington Rand 409, a plugboard programmed punched card calculator (but not introduced as a product until 1952 as the UNIVAC 60 then in 1953 as the UNIVAC 120 with double the memory).

They also sold punched card systems, beginning with the 1928 acquisition of the Powers Accounting Machine Company and ending in the 1950s.

=== Electric razors ===
Remington Rand also made electric razors. The Remington brand of razor was originally produced by a division of Remington Rand, starting in 1937. Sperry Corporation sold the division in 1979 to Victor Kiam, who became the company spokesman of the new Remington Products Company. His line, "I liked the shaver so much, I bought the company" became one of the more memorable advertising slogans of the early 1980s.

Remington Products was sold in 2003 to the battery manufacturer Rayovac. Rayovac is now Spectrum Brands.
