= Nancy Bailey =

English indexer

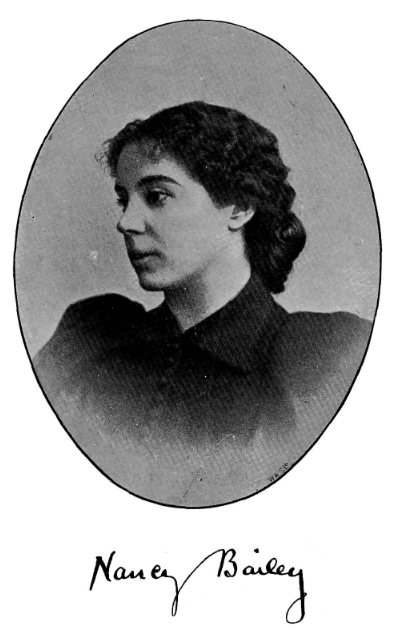
- Born: Edith Alice Bailey; 1863; Dawley, Shropshire, England
- Died: 1913 (aged 49–50)
- Occupation: Indexer

Nancy Bailey (1863–1913) was an English indexer and pioneer in the development of indexing as a profession, particularly for women, through her indexing agency office in London. She was official indexer of the Hansard parliamentary debates, The Times newspaper and Pearson's Weekly magazine.

== Early life ==
Nancy Bailey (aka Nancie Baily) was born as Edith Alice Bailey in 1863 in Dawley, Shropshire, the fourth of five children of Robert and Susannah Bailey. Her father was made bankrupt in the year Nancy was born and he died in 1867, forcing a family move to the village of St George's, now a parish of Telford. She and her sisters apprenticed as seamstresses and she was working as a live-in dressmaker at Edward Nye's drapery in Preston, Lancashire in 1881. She moved to London in around 1882–1883 and from this time favoured the name of Nancy.

== Career ==
Bailey initially had plans to become a writer, but for financial reasons she had to take various other jobs, eventually working at the College of Arms in London where she prepared abstracts of wills. Around 1885–1886 she was offered her first indexing job, to make the index to The Year's Art by Marcus Bourne Huish. This sparked her interest in indexing as an art and in investigating it as a feasible profession.

She met Thomas Curson Hansard (junior) in 1888 and was invited to index the Hansard current parliamentary debates. She held this indexing role from 1888 to 1891, when the debate reporting was taken over by Reuters.

Bailey then set up her own indexing office in London, initially living and working at Poet's Corner, Westminster. On 15 October 1892, a notice in The Englishwoman's Review advertised that Miss Bailey had opened an office in Bedford Square, London, to "undertake all kinds of indexing". She focused just on indexing services, unlike her indexing contemporary Mary Petherbridge and her Secretarial Bureau (founded in 1895), who offered instruction both in "Technical Indexing" and secretarial services. She received employment references on her indexing from the prime minister's office, the librarian of the House of Commons, and Richard Garnett, Keeper of Printed Books at the British Museum.

She obtained a post with the Pearson's Weekly tabloid magazine as its indexer and soon needed to hire assistants to help with the office workload. In 1893, she was also reappointed as Hansard official indexer, which she continued until the year 1901. She was commissioned in 1896 to compile retrospective indexes to Hansard covering the period 1830 to 1890, which she single-handedly created in four volumes by 1903.

In 1893, British suffragist and journalist Margaret Bateson interviewed Bailey about indexing for the 'Professional women on their professions' series in Queen magazine.

She was also interviewed by American journalist Mary Temple Bayard in 1893 for the Ladies Home Journal. A letter from newspaper editor W. T. Stead quoted in this 1894 issue congratulated and thanked Bailey for her "noble service" on indexing Hansard.

In 1897, she presented a paper to the Women's Education Conference at Earl's Court on the training of women in business, which was organised by Daisy Greville, Countess of Warwick. Bailey had by this time trained 40 women. Her speech was published in a book of the conference proceedings in 1898, with an index by Bailey's Indexing Office.

In 1898, Bailey was invited by Eyre & Spottiswoode to compile a monthly index to The Times newspaper. This was a rival to bookseller Samuel Palmer's quarterly indexes which had been published since 1868. Bailey's Index to The Times ran from 1899 to 1901. It had a cover design by Arthur Heygate Mackmurdo and received praise in the Pall Mall Gazette.

By 1900, Bailey's indexing business was working from larger offices at 5 Great College Street, eventually settling at 12 Little College Street, London. The indexing office's contracts included indexes for The Artist, Gentlewoman, the Journal of Finance, The Ladies' Field, the Liberal Magazine, the Morning Leader and Truth. She trained eight to ten female students per year, at a fee of £20 for a year of tuition. She had trained 70 women by 1902, including Edith May Haylett and the author Constance M. Foot.

== Later years ==
Bailey was never married nor had any children. She lived at Westminster Mansions from around 1900. The final index she produced is believed to be for Frederick Bradbury's A History of Old Sheffield Plate, published in 1912. She was diagnosed with cancer in 1912 and moved to a cottage on the country estate of her friend Arthur Heygate Mackmurdo in Wickham Bishops, Essex. She died there on 25 January 1913.

== Legacy ==
Bailey was a pioneering figure in the development of indexing as a career for women. The American press called her the "leading indexer in all Great Britain" and the "wonderful woman indexer of England". In W.T. Stead's words, she was owed thanks "for demonstrating the capacity of woman to do the work" and he acknowledged "that important post you have won for womanhood". In Dennis Duncan's recent book, Index, A History of the, Nancy Bailey is credited, along with Mary Petherbridge, for the vital role played by the indexing agencies in the history of the profession and the preponderance of women within it, helping to pave the way for modern indexing societies such as the Society of Indexers.

== Publications ==
'Indexing: a profession for women' in Progress in women's education in the British Empire (ed. Countess of Warwick, book of conference proceedings)
