= Index, A History of the =

2022 book by Dennis Duncan

Index, A History of the: A Bookish Adventure from Medieval Manuscripts to the Digital Age
- Author: Dennis Duncan
- Language: English
- Subject: Indexes
- Publisher: W. W. Norton & Company
- Publication date: February 15, 2022
- Pages: 352
- ISBN: 978-1-324-00254-3

Index, A History of the: A Bookish Adventure from Medieval Manuscripts to the Digital Age is a 2022 book by Dennis Duncan that examines the history of indexes. Indexes, argues Duncan—paraphrasing Jonathan Swift's Mechanical Operation of the Spirit (Note: In his A Tale of a Tub, Swift proposed that there "are the men who pretend to understand a book by scouting through the index, as if a traveller should go about to describe palace when he had seen nothing but the privy".)—allow the reader a legitimate means of starting a book from the back, a practice he compares to "travellers entering a palace through the privy".

== Background ==
In books, indexes are usually placed near the end (this is commonly known as "BoB" or back-of-book indexing). They complement the table of contents by enabling access to information by specific subject, whereas contents listings enable access through broad divisions of the text arranged in the order they occur. It has been remarked that, while "[a]t first glance the driest part of the book, on closer inspection the index may provide both interest and amusement from time to time."

== Book, title and author of ==
Dennis Duncan is a lecturer in English at University College London. The book's title has been described as particularly clever in how it "encapsulates both the subject and tone of Duncan's animated and amusing work". Steven Moore, for The Washington Post, argues that the title's distinct punctuation ensures that the book immediately stands out from being a "dry account of a small cogwheel in the publishing machine". Jennifer Szalai, for The New York Times, argues that while the book may sound as if it was a history of information science alone, it touches on far broader, more catholic, themes. These include, most obviously, the study of reading and writing, but also include "communication, learning and imagination, as well as competition, anxiety and no small amount of mischief".

== Index, pejorative uses of a ==
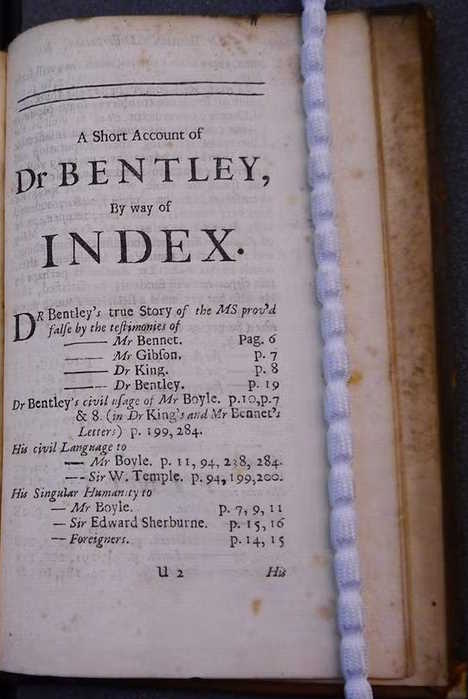
Faux index page to Bentley's book, 1698

Kurkowski argues that a particularly surprising aspect of the index, as Duncan devotes a chapter to how it can become "a passive-aggressive vehicle for lambasting one's enemies". He begins by noting how indexes can be used against an author as well as in the reader. This he calls "the rogue index ... [that is] weaponized against its primary text". For example, he recalls the mock index drawn up by several students of the 17th-century philologist and King's Librarian, Richard Bentley, of Christ Church, Oxford, which referenced Bentley's supposed "egregious dullness" and an assumed familiarity with works he never saw yet claimed to have used. Other insulting references were to his pedantry and "collection of asinine proverbs".

The children's author and mathematician Lewis Carroll, in the index to his Sylvie and Bruno contains an entry for "Sobriety, extreme inconvenience of". A similar technique was later used by the historian Hugh Trevor-Roper, who—while master of Peterhouse, Cambridge, a position he detested—"revenged himself on his detested colleagues" in the index of his latest piece pointed his readers, under the entry to his college, "Peterhouse: high-table conversation not very agreeable, 46; main source of perverts, 113". The "ultimate index compiled in bad faith", comments Douglas, is that of John Oldmixon, who was commissioned in 1718 to compose the index to Laurence Echard's A History of England. Echard was very much a High Tory, and his great man view of history reflected his conservative beliefs. Oldmixon, on the other hand, was a polemicist for the Whigs, and soundly at odds with Echard's views; he had already issued a "virulent barrage of pamphlets". Douglas comments that Oldmixon's commission gave him the opportunity for mischief: "As Duncan shows, his index undercuts Echard's intended meanings with sarcastic and deliberate misrepresentations, rewriting history from the safety of the back pages". Oldmixon's trolling of Echard had repercussions a century later, when another Whig historian, Thomas Macaulay, also the author of a The History of England, instructed his publisher to "let no damned Tory index my history". Sometimes targets were more general, such as this entry to a Tatler anthology: "Dull Fellows, who, 43 / Naturally turn their Heads to Politics or Poetry, ibid". On one occasion, William F. Buckley Jr. sent a copy of his latest book to Norman Mailer, and, knowing that Mailer's—who had a reputation for vanity—first act upon receiving it would be to look himself up in the index, wrote "hi!" by hand next to Mailer's entry.

== Index, structure of ==
Duncan analyses how indexes can weigh the readers' perspective. By their nature, they are the somewhat arbitrary and possibly subjective opinions of one person as to what to include and exclude. This makes it easier for certain points of view to pushed on the reader whether they realise it or not. Likewise, they are almost always arranged chronologically, which, Duncan says, shifts the quality of what the prose says to a formulaic entry alongside so many others; it is, the author puts it, a "great leveller". Duncan also considers the question of whether fictional works should have indexes, citing John Updike's comment that "most biographies are just novels with indexes". This became a particular source of argument in the 18th century, although ultimately a failed proposal. Alexander Pope, for example, attempted to index Shakespeare's plays. While basic facts were indexable, notes Duncan, problems arose for Pope when he attempted to organise the characters' "manners, passions and their external effects".

== Indexes, origins of ==
The indexes origins, says Duncan, maybe found in the Library of Alexandria, where in the 3rd century curators attached tags to scrolls to record their position and briefly itemise their contents; "not an index, but a start", suggests Duncan. In Europe, he argues, the index proper as we know it began with the bible with roots in the medieval universities and monasteries. This stemmed from the growing necessity of medieval preachers to organise their work coherently, particularly with making quotations and scripture easier to find. The 13th-century religious philosopher Robert Grosseteste wrote a Table of Distinctions, which Duncan calls Grosseteste's own Google on parchment. Instead of arranging his entries at the rear of the book, or arranged alphabetically, he used a series of symbols and icons to mark certain paragraphs and segments of texts. This list—of around 440 items—enabled quick and easy access to the many sources he relied on in the course of his speaking career, whether as preacher or statesman. Grosseteste, as a polymath, says Duncan, needed something to bring "cosmos out of chaos. An encyclopedic mind needs an encyclopedic index to provide it with structure."

At first it was feared that merely mechanical indexes such as these would make books themselves redundant, as there would be no need to consult the original work. Duncan argues that it is not a coincidence that it is the norm to use the same finger—the index finger—to scroll down an index as it is to jab the air as if emphasising a point, both aspects of the medieval religious debate. He demonstrates various forms of immediate usage the index lent itself too:

Disputation, the citing of authorities, the reading-out of commentaries (a format with a now familiar name: the lecture): scholastic learning would favour external demonstration over inner revelation, intellectual agility over endless meditation.

Indeed, the Papacy's own catalogue of books deemed unchristian was the Index Librorum Prohibitorum. The modern index, Duncan argues, required two essential components to be themselves invented before there could be an index: alphabetisation and pagination. The latter came about when numbered pages became the norm for printed works, along with a cultural shift from writing on scrolls to codices. Duncan argues that, when monks, for example, re-wrote existing works—as was the norm before the invention of printing—they effectively rendered any previous index useless, as their pagination was almost certainly to be different. It was also seen as intrusive; numbers became as important as words, and the numbers themselves reflected the physical form of the book rather than its intellectual contents. Duncan described his feelings viewing a particular manuscript from 1470, of

Disbelief that something so significant, something of such conceptual magnitude, should be here on my desk ... It feels astonishing that I should be allowed to pick it up, hold it, turn its pages ... I feel like I am on the verge of tears.

The reason, he explained, for his emotion was that the manuscript had a small number one printed on the first page. This was the first printed page number in history, which Duncan describes as "miraculous".

Alphabetisation was seen as "an irrational method of categorization". It required a cultural shift in the practice of the creator, and the mind of a reader, who had to consciously start spelling consistently. Middle English was generally spelled as it was heard, being based on pronunciation, and as such there was no firm or readily accepted absolute spelling. Hence its continued rarity throughout the Middle Ages, when it was actively disdained as "the antithesis of reason" as, being a list, it did not stimulate original thought.

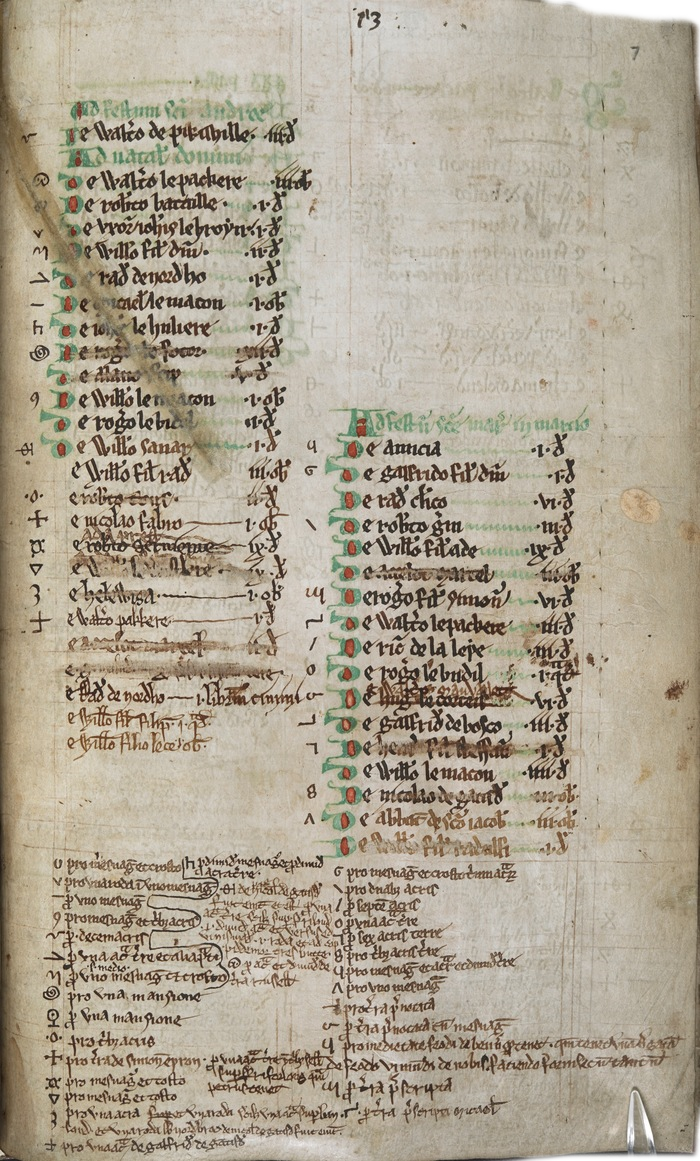
Medieval MS index from c.1240; note the page number at the top of the leaf.

=== Indexes, argument over ===
The invention of printing, though, led not only to the proliferation of indexers, but the proliferation of disparaging and pejorative terms with which they and their trade were called, such as "index-raker", possessing only "index learning". Indicating the degree to which early indexes were seen as counterintuitive, or not user friendly, many contained an initial paragraph of explanation as to its use and benefit. Ralph Jones, writing in the New Humanist describes his surprise to find that "by the 18th century the index was ... subject divisive enough to invite disdain and incite literary bickering", and accusations of encouraging skim-reading. Duncan, however, emphasises the degree to which an indexer was a practitioner of manual labour, if a painstaking form of it. Conversely, their commitment was also always to a higher plain, an intellectual exercise requiring neutrality for the sake of the reader, who demands repeated and concerted decision-making on their behalf. In Time, Cady Lang suggests that the "often overlooked" index may have saved lives in the course of its existence. Duncan ascribes a degree of the index's initially poor reputation as being down to the fact that it "kill[ed] off experimental curiosity" in the 17th century and has been looked down on since. It was not abnormal, he says, for readers to enter a book from the back and so prejudge whether to carry on. Szalai also questions whether a reader "of an intimidatingly big book decide only to skim the simulacrum—the bite-size summary offered by the index—instead of immersing themselves in the real thing?"; likewise, Douglas asks, whether—and especially regarding fiction—"with an index, will readers pick out only the good bits?" Steven Moore—"a literary critic who moonlights an indexer"—attests to the arguments that continue to this day as to the extent and detail an index should be expected to go before it removes the necessity of reading the work itself. Moore comments how "I had one client who wished every noun in his book could be indexed, and I’ve often had to point out to authors that an index is not a concordance (which lists every word in a book in alphabetical order)".

== Indexes, digital ==
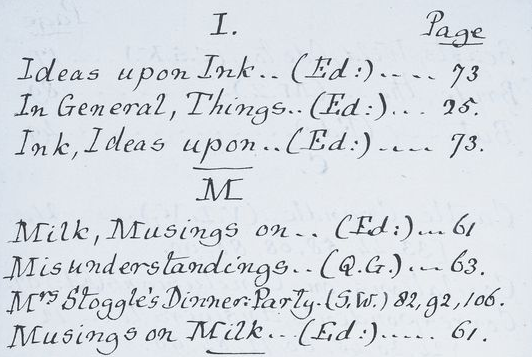
A portion of an index written by Lewis Carroll in his own hand from 1849.

Writing in The Guardian, Peter Conrad argues that modern search engines and other methods of instant online searching has "slashed our attention span and made memory redundant". Despite the increasing sophistication of e-readers and search functionality, Duncan disputes that a search engine can replace the ability of a human to browse, synthesise and interpret what it intellectually ingests. This, he suggests, is because the software is tied to tags and categories, with rigid boundaries and strict demarcations; humans are not. Duncan subscribes to the view that, in the same way as to how those in the Middle Ages feared for the future of books in the face of indexing, indexes today face a similar foe. He reminds his readers that Google itself is little more than an index for the biggest library in the world. Duncan argues that indexes represent a symbiotic relationship between any given point in man's history and the breadth of his knowledge at that point; as Szalai puts it, "the morass of the digital world is indexed and served up to us by search engines". Duncan argues that, while digital search may well encourage laziness, "It is good for the nerves, I think, to have some historical perspective"; he also argues that, in today's context, "anxieties about information technology are as old as writing itself". However, argues Duncan, human input will still be required in at least an oversighting role, tidying up after the software.

== Response, critical ==
Ralph Jones described the book as both "educat[ing] and entertain[ing] in the same breath", remaining "annotated and amusing" throughout, if seeking to ensure that the reader never loses sight of the sophistication of the topic. Time Magazine listed it as one of its top 100 books of 2022, calling it a "delightful history" of its subject. Szalai wrote how, while she had previous seen the index as a tool, a mundane, functionary item, Duncan brings imagination and discipline to his topic, "elucidating dense, scholarly concepts with a light touch". Adam Douglas, in the Literary Review, called it a "puckish eulogy" to the topic and "a trove of bookish anecdote" while being "wittily engaging, wide-ranging". In the Washington Independent Review of Books, Peggy Kurkowski praises Duncan's ability to convey even the most complex themes "with impish insight and erudition", occasionally titillating and overall a "delightful ensemble of history, technology, literary lore, and information science". Moore, agreeing with the book's subtitle, calls it an "engaging ... adventure and 'bookish' in the most appealing sense".

Bain's index was also highlighted for praise by the Literary Review, New York Times and, among others, The Washington Post; in the latter, Steven Moore wrote, "As might be expected, the index—created not by the author but by Paula Clarke Bain—is magnificent".

== Index, A History of the, Indexes to ==
Modern indexes are created by professional indexers rather than the authors, and Duncan's book possesses two indexes. The first is composed by commercial indexing software, the second—"playfully"—by Paula Clarke Bain of the Society of Indexers. Szalai describes the relationship between the latter and Duncan's book itself "not just as a guide but also as a companion", while the commercial package "spat out"—in many cases, seemingly random—entries for trivial words such as "alas" and "all the letters". The computer basically chops the book into small sections and names an index entry after each. This would have made the computerised index almost as long as the actual book, had Duncan not cancelled it at "amusement, mere" and passed responsibility over to Bain, whose own version contains "some amusing running gags", says Douglas; and, comments Szalai, "comes into its own". Barbara Spindel, in The Christian Science Monitor, describes the choice of two indexes as being "inspired": that composed by the software, she contends, is "boring and occasionally nonsensical"; Bain's, on the other hand, ensures that to Spindel, "the fun continues to the very last page". But the point is a serious one, says Kurkowski; by highlighting the paucity of the artificially generated index compared with that of Bain, Duncan allows the two indexes, side by side, to make his point for him and "to show how things should be done".

== Examples, notable ==
- Martin Amis's memoir, Experience contains in its index references under, for example, "Dental problems", to items such as "— of animals", "—Bellow on" and "— dentifrice purchase".
- Duncan includes fictive indexes, for example that comprising the whole—and telling the whole story of—J. G. Ballard's story 'The Index', or Nabokov's 1962 Pale Fire, in which a deranged editor creates an index to disparage an author's literary output.

== Links, external ==
- "The Index: A History. With Susie Dent and Dennis Duncan" – discussion between Duncan and lexicographer Susie Dent at the British Library on indexing, 8 September 2021.
