= Mary Petherbridge =

English indexer and writer

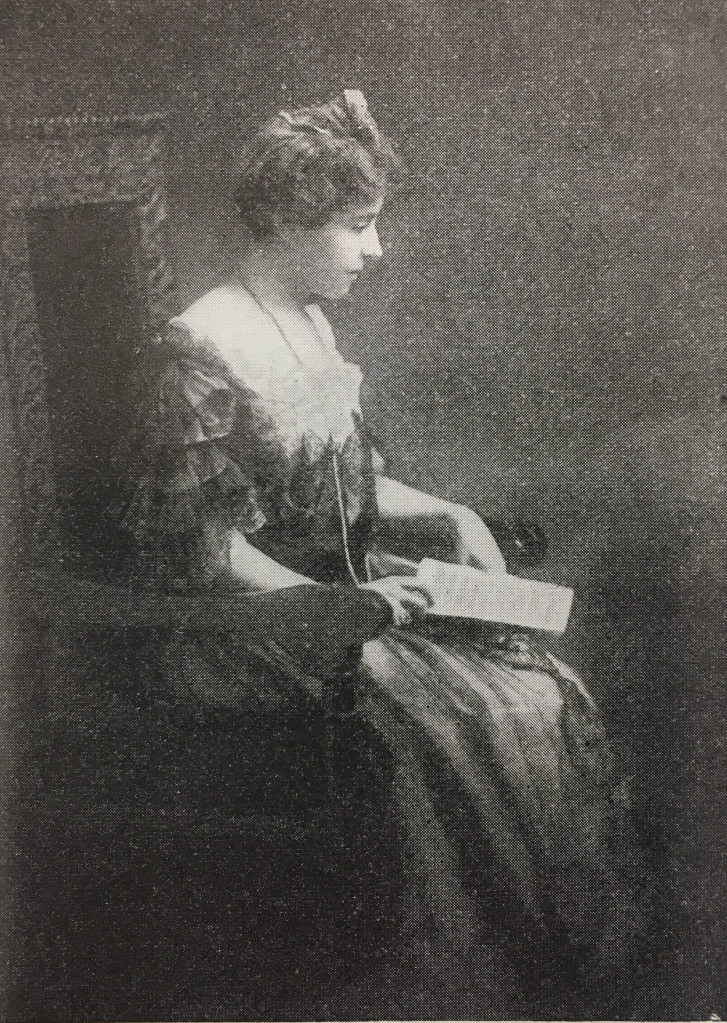
- Born: 1870; London, England
- Died: 1940 (aged 69–70)
- Education: Newnham College, Cambridge
- Occupations: Indexer; librarian; writer
- Notable work: The Technique of Indexing

Mary Petherbridge (1870–1940) was an English indexer and writer and a key figure in the development of freelance indexing as a career for women. She was the founder of the Secretarial Bureau in London and the author of the book The Technique of Indexing, published in 1904. She was Official Indexer to H.M. Government from 1918 until her death in 1940.

== Life ==
Mary Petherbridge was born in London in 1870. She was educated at the North London Collegiate School. She graduated from the Natural Sciences Tripos at Newnham College, University of Cambridge, in 1893. She first worked as a librarian in the People's Palace, London, and then studied librarianship in America for a year. She set up the Secretarial Bureau in London in 1895, initially in The Strand, later in Conduit Street, which provided indexer, secretary and translator services, and training in indexing and secretarial work for women. One of her pupils was Theodora Bosanquet, later secretary to Henry James who had approached the Bureau for a suitable candidate.

Petherbridge was indexer of the East India Company's records and the India Office, the Drapers' Company's records, and The Ladies' Field periodical, among other work. The India Office index entries by Petherbridge and her small staff of women comprise 430,000 entries in 72 volumes, nearly a third of the total entries in the Records catalogue. She closed down the Secretarial Bureau soon after completing the indexing of the India correspondence in 1929. She continued as Official Indexer to H.M. Government from 1918 until her death in 1940.

Petherbridge published the booklet The Technique of Indexing in 1904, which purported to be an 'elementary text-book and practical guide to indexing'. In September 1923, her article 'Indexing As A Profession for Women' appeared in Good Housekeeping magazine. This article is reproduced in the 'Index makers' profile of her in The Indexer journal. She is also one of the indexer profiles featured in Hazel K. Bell's book From Flock Beds to Professionalism: A History of Index-Makers (2008).

Petherbridge was a pioneer in promoting freelance indexing as an occupation and in training women to do it. Along with Nancy Bailey, she played a key role in the development of indexing as a serious profession choice, as continued now by the Society of Indexers and other indexing societies around the world.

== Publications ==
Publications written by Mary Petherbridge include:

- The Technique of Indexing (1904)
- 'Indexing', The Englishwoman's Year Book and Directory (1914)
- 'Indexing As A Profession for Women', Good Housekeeping (September 1923)
