= Automated tagging =

Automated tagging may refer to:

- Various techniques in Object recognition and categorization
  - Automatic image annotation
- Various techniques in text processing and natural language processing
  - Document classification
  - Part-of-speech tagging
  - Named entity recognition
  - Latent semantic indexing
  - Automated indexing
- Automated music categorization
- Automated semantic annotation, i.e. semantic tagging
