= Natural order =

Natural order may refer to:

== Science ==
- Natural order (philosophy), concept in philosophy
- Natural order hypothesis, hypotheses of second-language acquisition
- Ordo naturalis, Latin for "natural order" once used to describe plant families
- In enumeration, a natural ordering in which a set of items might be enumerated
- The natural order defined for the monus operation, on monoids and semirings

== Music ==
- Natural Order (album), 1990 album by Hellbastard

== Card games ==
- Natural order (cards), the standard ranking of cards within a suit e.g. from Ace (high) to Deuce (low) or Deuce (high) to Seven (low)

== See also ==
- Natural sort order
