= Index card =

Standard sized card for recording data

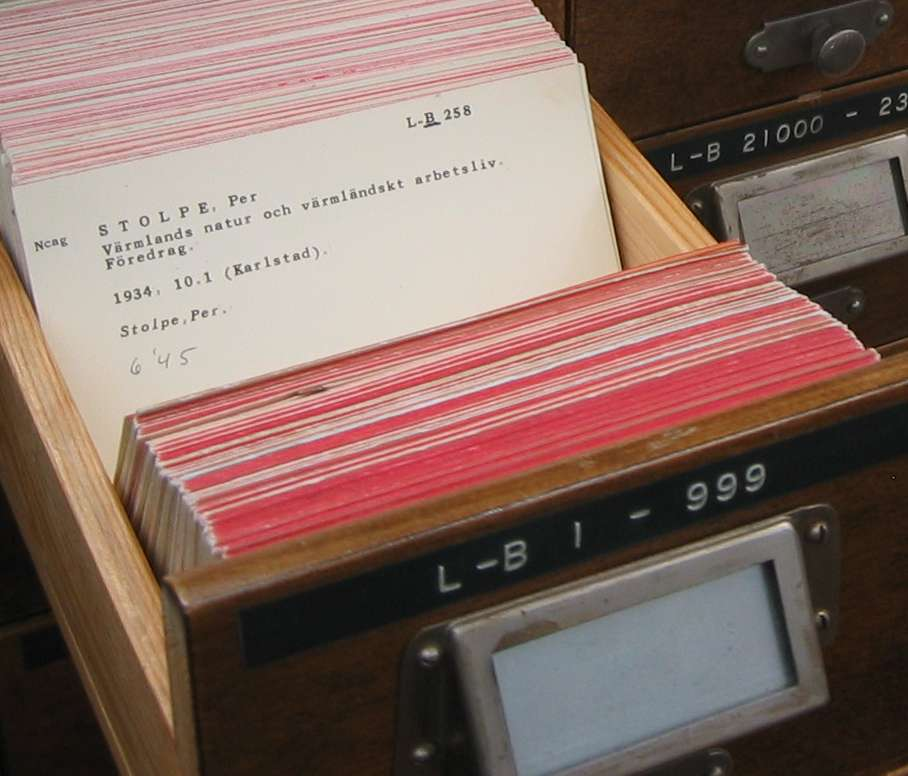
An index card in a library card catalog. This type of cataloging has mostly been supplanted by computerization.

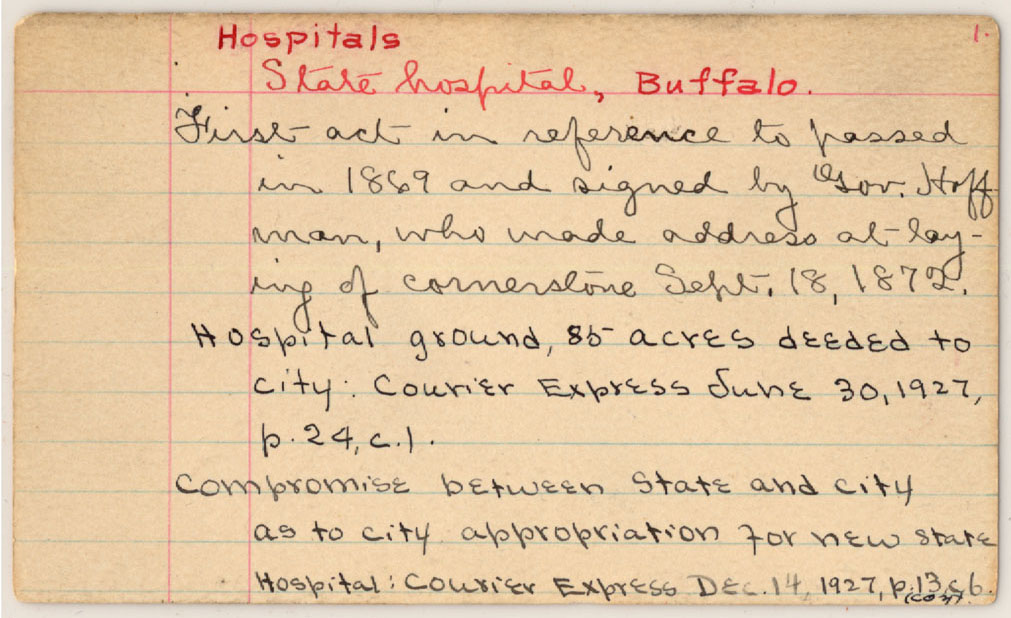
A hand-written American index card

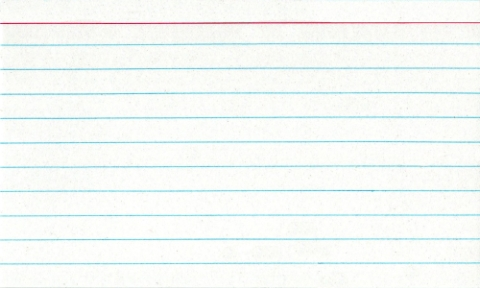
A ruled index card

An index card, called a record card in British English and a system card in Australian English, consists of card stock (heavy paper) cut to a standard size, used for recording and storing small amounts of discrete data. A collection of such cards either serves as, or aids the creation of, an index for expedited lookup of information (such as a library catalog or a back-of-the-book index). This system is said to have been invented by Carl Linnaeus, around 1760.

== Format ==
The most common size for index card in North America and the UK is 3 by 5 inches (76.2 by 127.0 mm), hence the common name 3-by-5 card. Other sizes widely available include 4 by 6 inches (101.6 by 152.4 mm), 5 by 8 inches (127.0 by 203.2 mm) and ISO-size A7 (74 by 105 mm or 2.9 by 4.1 in). Cards are available in blank, ruled and grid styles in a variety of colors. Special divider cards with protruding tabs and a variety of cases and trays to hold the cards are also sold by stationers and office product companies. They are part of standard stationery and office supplies all around the globe.

== Uses ==
Index cards are used for a wide range of applications and environments: in the home to record and store recipes, shopping lists, contact information and other organizational data; in business to record presentation notes, project research and notes, and contact information; in schools as flash cards or other visual aids; and in academic research to hold data such as bibliographical citations or notes in a card file. Professional book indexers used index cards in the creation of book indexes until they were replaced by indexing software in the 1980s and 1990s.

An often suggested organization method for bibliographical citations and notes in a card file is to use the smaller 3-inch by 5-inch cards to record the title and citation information of works cited, while using larger cards for recording quotes or other data, but some people have also given the opposite advice to put everything on one size of card.

Index cards are used for many events and are helpful for planning.

== History ==
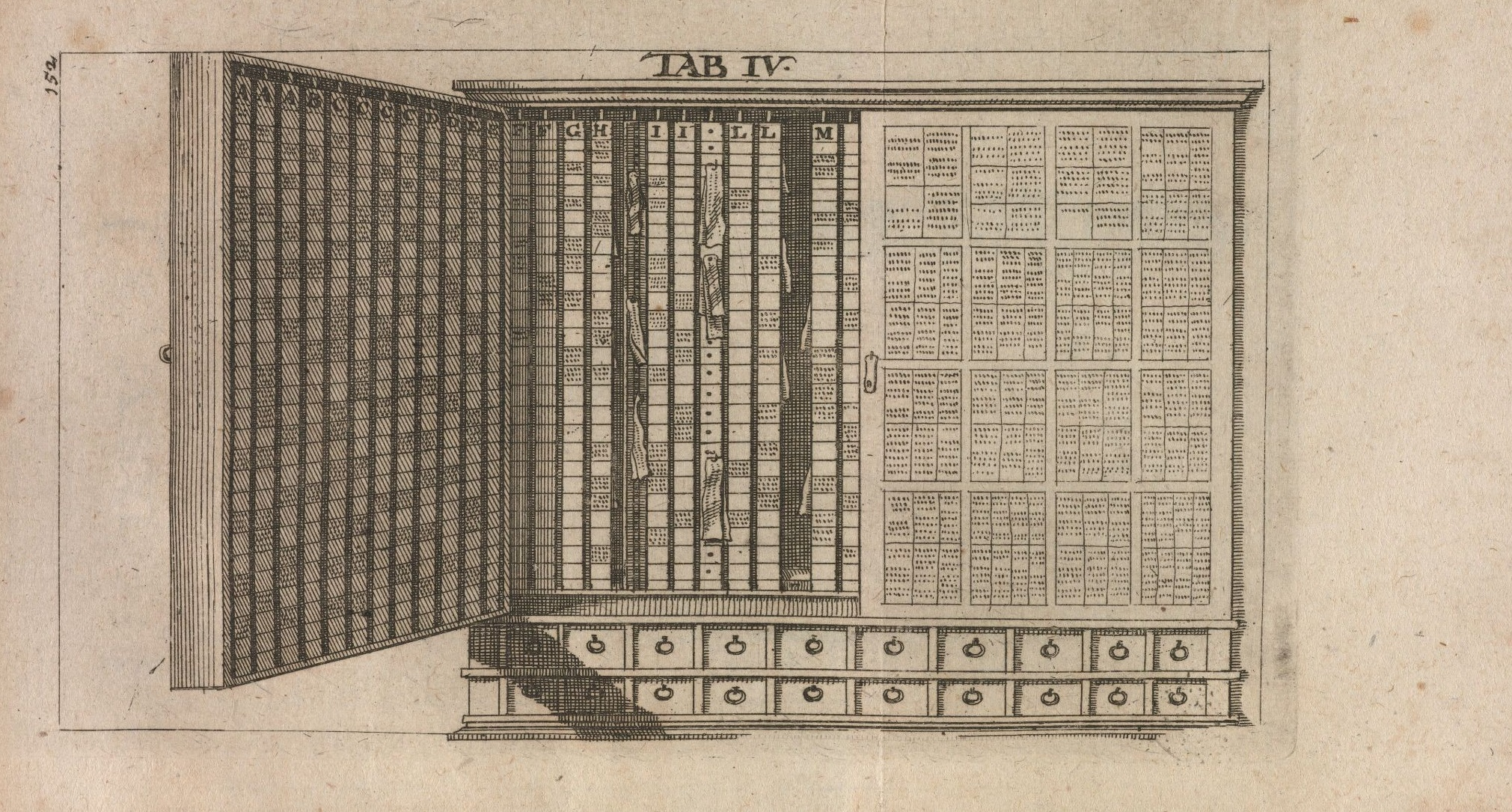
Filing cabinet for paper slips in Vincent Placcius's De arte excerpendi (1689)

The first early modern card cabinet was designed by 17th-century English inventor Thomas Harrison (c. 1640s). Harrison's manuscript on the "ark of studies" (Arca studiorum) describes a small cabinet that allows users to excerpt books and file their notes in a specific order by attaching pieces of paper to metal hooks labeled by subject headings. Harrison's system was edited and improved by Vincent Placcius in his well-known handbook on excerpting methods (De arte excerpendi, 1689). The German polymath Gottfried Wilhelm Leibniz (1646–1716) was known to have relied on Harrison's invention in at least one of his research projects.

Carl Linnaeus, an 18th-century naturalist who formalized binomial nomenclature, is said to have "invented the index card" c. 1760 in order to help deal with the information overload facing early scientists that occurred from overseas discoveries, though there is room for dispute about whether he alone was the index card's inventor. Linnaeus had to deal with a conflict between needing to bring information into a fixed order for purposes of later retrieval, and needing to integrate new information into that order permanently. His solution was to keep information on particular subjects on separate sheets, which could be complemented and reshuffled. In the mid 1760s Linnaeus refined this into what are now called index cards. Index cards could be selected and moved around at will to update and compare information at any time.

In the late 1890s, edge-notched cards were invented, which allowed for easy sorting of data by means of a needle-like tool. These edge-notched cards were phased out in the 1980s in favor of computer databases, and they are no longer sold.

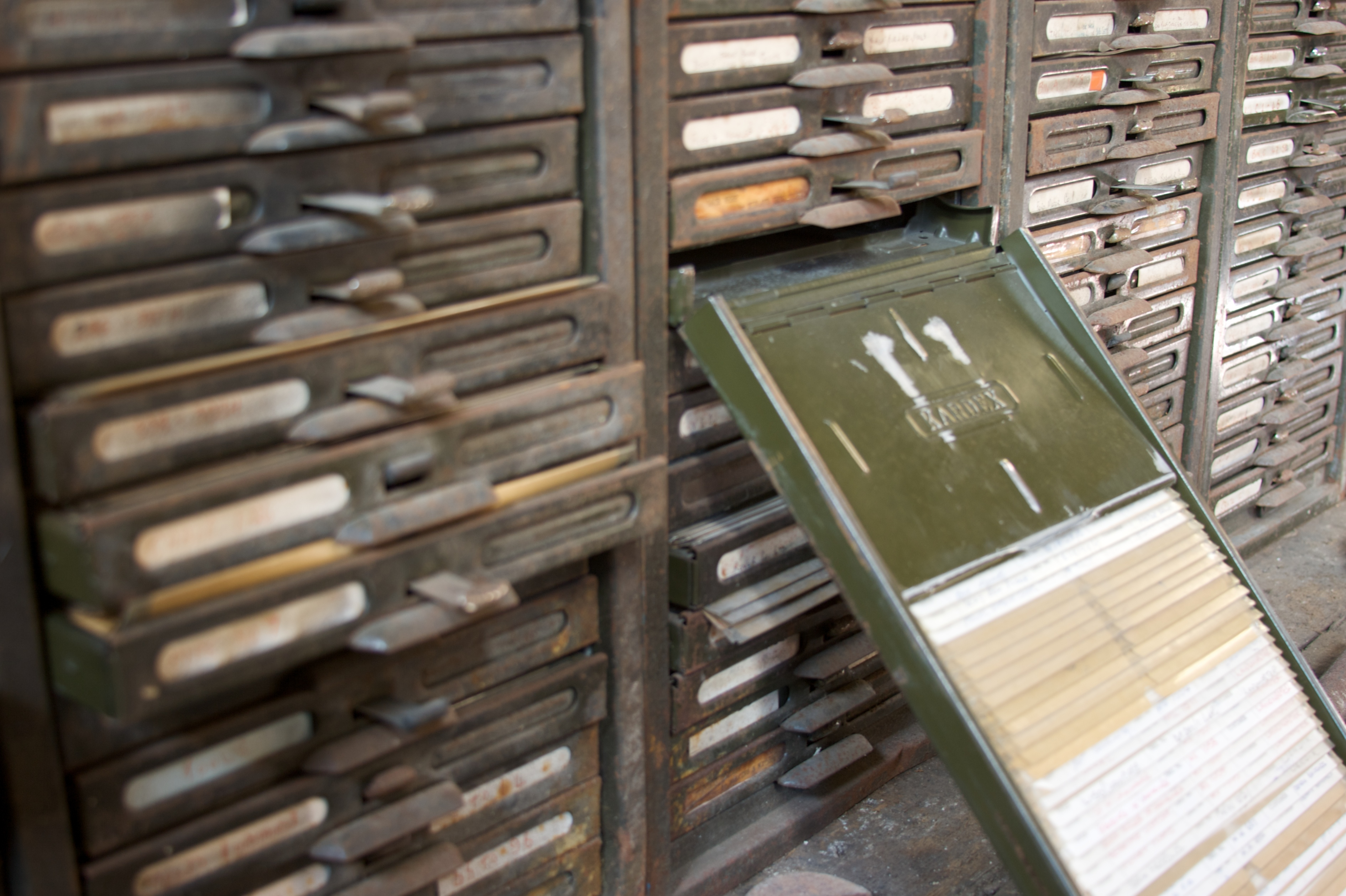
Kardex index card filing system

James Rand, Sr.'s Rand Ledger Company (founded 1898) with its Visible Ledger system, and his son James Rand, Jr.'s American Kardex dominated sales of index card filing systems worldwide through much of the 20th century. "Kardex" became a common noun, especially in the medical records field where "filing a kardex" came to mean filling out a patient record on an index card.

Library card catalogs as currently known arose in the 19th century, and Melvil Dewey standardized the index cards used in library card catalogs in the 1870s. Until the digitization of library catalogs, which began in the 1980s, the primary tool used to locate books was the card catalog, in which every book was described on three cards, filed alphabetically under its title, author, and subject (if non-fiction). Similar catalogs were used by law firms and other entities to organize large quantities of stored documents. However, the adoption of standard cataloging protocols throughout nations with international agreements, along with the rise of the Internet and the conversion of cataloging systems to digital storage and retrieval, has made obsolescent the widespread use of index cards for cataloging.

Many authors have used index cards for the writing of books. Vladimir Nabokov wrote his works on index cards, a practice mentioned in his work Pale Fire.

== See also ==
- Address book – Database used for storing contact details
- Card sorting – Knowledge elicitation research method
- CRC cards – Software brainstorming tool
- Cue card – Cards that help speakers remember what to say
- Edge-notched card – Index card with notches to store data
- Hipster PDA – Satirical pen and paper personal organizer
- Paper size – Standard sizes of paper
- Punched card – Paper-based recording medium
- Rolodex – Rotating card file device
