= Australian and New Zealand Society of Indexers =

Professional association

- Abbreviation: ANZSI
- Founded: 1976
- Website: https://www.anzsi.org/

The Australian and New Zealand Society of Indexers (ANZSI) is a society representing indexers in Australia and New Zealand. It had branches and groups in ACT, New South Wales, New Zealand, Northern Territory, Queensland, South Australia, Tasmania, Victoria, and Western Australia. In 2015 it abolished branches and adopted a national structure.

ANZSI provided training courses until online courses became available from other sources. It holds conferences, publishes a newsletter, and provides a directory of available indexers. ANZSI awards scholarships for formal indexing training.

== History ==
ANZSI was established as the Australian Society of Indexers (AusSI) in Melbourne in 1976 to replace the Society of Indexers in Australia, which was founded by Australian members of the UK Society of Indexers. Its early history was recorded by Hazel Bell and Madeleine Davis.

== Affiliation with other indexing societies ==
The International Committee of Representatives of Indexing Societies (ICRIS) was formed after several years of discussion and negotiation between indexing societies; it held its first formal Triennial Meeting in 2000 in Cambridge, UK.

Through ICRIS ANZSI is affiliated with indexing societies in the UK, the United States, Canada, Southern Africa, and China; and associated with societies in Germany (DNI) and the Netherlands (NIN).

== Awards ==
ANZSI Medals (known as the John Simkin Medal since 2014) and highly commended certificates are offered periodically since 1985 for an outstanding index to a book or periodical compiled in Australia or New Zealand. Medals and certificates are not awarded every year. Notable recipients include musicologist and indexer Samantha Owens, who was awarded a medal in 2012.

ANZSI (then AusSI) was the first indexing society in the world to recognise web indexing with an award. The Web Index Prize was offered annually between 1996 and 2000; between 2001 and 2006 this award was replaced by the ANZSI Web Index Award.

== Publications ==
The ANZSI Newsletter has been published at varying frequencies over the years. It was issued in print form until 2013 and has been digital-only since 2014. In addition, ANZSI members are regular contributors to the international journal, The Indexer, and ANZSI events were documented in the "Around the World" section.
