= Petherbridge =

Petherbridge is a surname. Notable people with the surname include:

- Alan Petherbridge (born 1927), athlete
- Edward Petherbridge (born 1936), English actor, writer and artist
- George Petherbridge (1927–2013), football player
- Louise Petherbridge (born 1931), New Zealand actor, director, deviser, producer and lecturer
- Mary Petherbridge (1870–1940), English indexer and founder of the Secretarial Bureau
- Thomas Topham Petherbridge, land owner
