= Mac and Mc together =

Convention in collation

A convention of sorting names with the Scottish and Irish patronymic prefixes Mac and Mc together persists in library science and archival practice. An example is from the Archives at the Yale University Beinecke Rare Book and Manuscript Library. It is also applied in areas such as voter registration, where Mac and Mc names may be sorted together in a listing. Technically this is a convention in collation.

On the other hand, ASCII is a computer standard and its corresponding sorting is gradually replacing this exception to ordinary alphabetisation. Rules once used for filing have been dropped for some newer computer systems, and the interfiling of Mac and Mc names is an example, according to a 2006 book.

There are in fact a number of options. In addition to sorting them under "Mac" and "Mc" respectively or choosing to sort them both under "Mac", it is known for Mc/Mac names to be placed in separate position before M. Sorting both under "Mc" is generally avoided as it can cause issues with names that do not contain the prefix (such as Macclesfield or Macey).

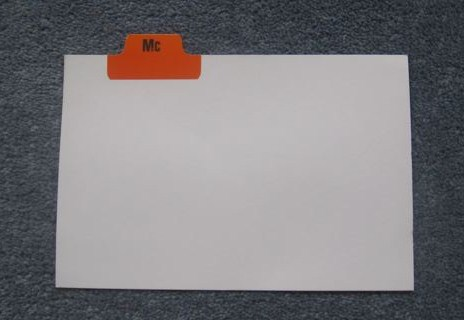
Mc tab on a file card divider of British origin. Some traditional filing systems treated Mac/Mc names as if the prefix were a letter such as a putative "Mc" between L and M or between M and N in the alphabet.

== History ==
This topic has a complicated and disparate history, spread over different continents and relating to different areas of indexing, cataloguing and filing. The idea of a collating sequence itself has evolved, over time, and the "Mac and Mc" together example has been taken as representative of a possible paradigm.

=== Older views on alphabetisation and standardisation ===
A book on filing rules from 1918 gives an example showing Mc and M' treated as abbreviations, i.e. for Mac, and ordered as if in the expanded version; and a similar book from 1922 makes the rule one of a number that apply also to St. (Saint) and Mrs. (Mistress).

A 1938 book that is a comparative study of cataloguing in various British libraries regarded Mac + Mc + M' sorting as an example of achieved "standardisation" in alphabetisation. It gave further examples where, it argued, such standardisation would be beneficial. One example was

ä → ae

in the sense of alphabetising any word with ä as if the letter were replaced by "ae". Other examples given are the replacement of Sainte by "Saint" to accommodate the French adjective in its feminine form; or Archives in journal titles by "Archive". The example of the Fitz prefix, a Norman French patronymic, is applied by ignoring the following space, which may or may not occur. The technical terms the author applies are "letter by letter" or "all through" for the case where spaces are ignored, and "word by word" or "nothing before something" for the case where space comes before A in the alphabet. In actual practice, some indexes, such as the British Union Catalogue of Periodicals, did practice such extensive standardisation. Sometimes by various technical devices such as replacing terms with conventional abbreviations that would be the same in all languages.

=== A US library view (1942) for card sorting ===
Donald Knuth in vol. 3 of his The Art of Computer Programming gave a listing showing the operation of around 40 rules, of which "Mc = Mac" was one, for library card sorting. He was citing the American Library Association Rules for Filing Catalog Cards (1942). According to the ALA wiki, it maintains in print two publications on filing rules, one covering that "word-by-word" convention, and another prepared in 1980 that is "letter-by-letter". A 1998 book attributes the changes to the rules to computer informatics, and notes the Mac/Mc change as its first example.

=== Examples from the recent past ===
1982's Scottish Roots, a guide for family history researchers, warns that older Scottish records do not in fact follow this convention, unlike contemporary telephone directories. A 2001 book of The New York Times theatre reviews sorts Mc names as if spelled Mac. A 2002 official document for the State of Vermont recommends explicitly no special treatment for Mac and Mc. New Hart's Rules (Oxford University Press, 2005) advises "List names prefixed with Mc, Mac, or M^{c} as if they were spelled Mac". A 2007 book in its tenth edition states that "most library catalogs" sort Mac and Mc names as if spelled M-a-c.

== Other contemporary standards ==
Among the guides which generally recommend separating Mac and Mc so that names will be sorted exactly as they are spelled are ISO 999, The Chicago Manual of Style, Butcher's Copy-editing: The Cambridge Handbook for Editors, Copy-editors and Proofreaders, The New York Times Manual of Style and Usage, and The SBL Handbook of Style.
