= Samantha Owens =

New Zealand musicologist and music historian

Samantha Owens FAHA
- Awards: Fellow of the Australian Academy of the Humanities, John Simkin Medal

Academic background
- Education: Victoria University of Wellington
- Thesis: The Württemberg Hofkapelle c.1680–1721 (1995)
- Doctoral advisor: Peter Walls

Samantha Kim Owens FAHA is a New Zealand oboe player, musicologist and music historian. She is a Fellow of the Australian Academy of the Humanities, and was awarded the Lilburn Research Fellowship for 2025.

== Academic career ==
Owens completed a PhD on the Württemberg court chapel and it musicians, at Victoria University of Wellington. In 2001, Owens joined the faculty of the School of Music at the University of Queensland, where she worked until 2015, at which point she moved to the New Zealand School of Music at Victoria University of Wellington. She rose to full professor in 2019 and gave her inaugural professorial lecture in 2023. Owens remains an honorary professor at the University of Queensland. Owens became a freelance musicologist in 2024. She is also known as an oboe player.

Owens research covers music performance and culture, including the history of German music and musicians in Australasia, court music in Germany in the early modern period, the history of the oboe, and professional women musicians in the 17th and 18th centuries. She has written and edited a number of books and monographs, and her editions of musical works by Johann Sigismund Kusser have been performed in Ireland, London and Germany.

== Honours and awards ==
Owens was elected a Fellow of the Australian Academy of the Humanities in 2012. Owens has twice held a Von Humboldt Fellowships, and has been a visiting fellow at the Martin Luther University Halle-Wittenberg, the Bach Archive in Leipzig, the Herzog August Library in Wolfenbuettel, and at Clare Hall, University of Cambridge.

In 2012, Owens was awarded the Australian and New Zealand Society of Indexers medal, for the index of the Boydell Press 2011 book Music at German Courts: Changing Artistic Priorities.

Owens was awarded the Lilburn Research Fellowship for 2025, for a project on the history of brass bands in New Zealand.

== Selected works ==
- The Well-Travelled Musician: John Sigismond Cousser and Musical Exchange in Baroque Europe (Woodbridge, Suffolk: Boydell Press, 2017)
- Johann Sigismund Kusser, Serenatas for Dublin (Middleton, WI: A-R Editions, 2020)
- J. S. Bach in Australia: Studies in Reception and Performance with Denis Collins and Kerry Murphy (Melbourne: Lyrebird Press, 2018)
- Searches for Tradition: Essays on New Zealand Music, Past & Present, with Michael Brown (Wellington: Victoria University Press, 2017)
- Music at German Courts, 1715–1760: Changing Artistic Priorities, with Barbara M. Reul and Janice B. Stockigt (Woodbridge, Suffolk: Boydell Press, 2011; paperback, 2015)
- Johann Sigismund Kusser, Adonis (Middleton, WI: A-R Editions, 2009)
