= MakeIndex =

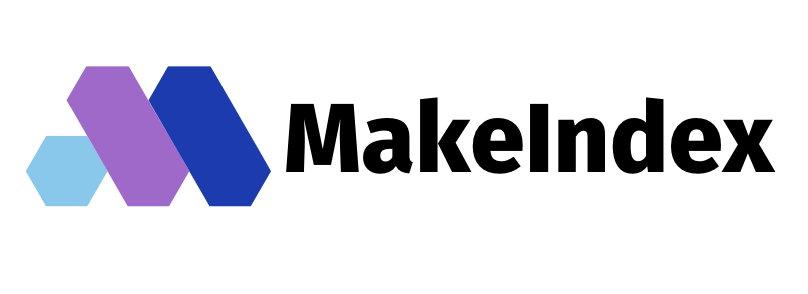
Logo Makeindex

MakeIndex is a computer program which provides a sorted index from unsorted raw data. MakeIndex can process raw data output by various programs, however, it is generally used with LaTeX and troff.

MakeIndex was written around the year 1986 by Pehong Chen in the C programming language and is free software. Six pages of documentation titled "MakeIndex: An Index Processor for LaTeX" by Leslie Lamport are available on the web and dated "17 February 1987."

== See also ==
- xindy
