= Indexing Society of Canada =

The Indexing Society of Canada/Société canadienne d'indexation (ISC/SCI) was established in 1977 as Canada's national association of indexers (professionals who create indexes for books, periodicals, web sites, and more).

Originally known as the Indexing and Abstracting Society of Canada/Société canadienne pour l'analyse de documents (IASC/SCAD), its name was changed in 2006 to reflect the fact that indexing is the major specialty of its members; however, members maintain a variety of skill sets.

== History ==
Although Canada’s national indexing society was formally established in 1977, its origins go back to the early seventies. When the Index Committee of the Bibliographical Society of Canada held its first executive meeting on March 20, 1971, in Toronto, it was resolved that

the Committee should concern itself primarily with the promotion of indexing and the training of indexers, rather than undertake major indexing projects itself. Guidelines for future activities were agreed upon, including the compilation of a Union List of Indexes and a Directory of Indexers.

An "index training workshop pilot project" was later set up in co-operation with the School of Library Science (now the Faculty of Information) at the University of Toronto.

In March 1977, the Committee on Bibliographical Services for Canada (CBSC) hosted an indexing and abstracting workshop in the National Library of Canada (now Library and Archives Canada). Attendees "noted the absence of a specific forum for abstracters and indexers in Canada, and recommended that such an association be formed." The CBSC then sponsored an Open Forum for Indexers and Abstracters on June 12, 1977, at the Canadian Library Association conference in Montreal. This meeting led to the establishment of IASC/SCAD.

=== Affiliation with the Society of Indexers ===
The first International Conference of the British Society of Indexers (SI) in 1978 was attended by IASC/SCAD representatives, who discussed with their British counterparts affiliation of the Canadian organization with the SI. As noted by the SI:

It was Canada's bilingualism, reinforced by the influence of a strong contingent of delegates from France, that stimulated consideration – for the first time – of the possibility of moving out of the English-speaking limitations within which we have hitherto operated. Even before the formalities of affiliation are completed, the youngest member of the family is already making its influence felt.

Formal affiliation of IASC/SCAD with the SI took place on January 1, 1979, and terms of affiliation were published in The Indexer in April 1979. At that time, IASC/SCAD had 115 individual and institutional members.

== Membership ==
Society members are located across Canada, and there are members in the United States and Europe as well. The Society encourages students to join by offering them a special membership rate.

=== Regional representation ===
The Society has established four regions, each with its own representative: British Columbia; Central Canada; Eastern Canada; and the Prairies and Northern Canada. Regional boundaries are reviewed annually to ensure that they reflect the geographic distribution of Society membership.

== Publications ==
The Bulletin is published three times a year, and the Register of Indexers Available annually.

=== Register listings ===
In addition to an alphabetical listing, the Register lists indexers by their skill sets, materials indexed, and subjects indexed. Indexers who work in French are also given separate listings. Some specialized skills listed in the Register include glossary writing, HTML encoding, project management, teaching, and thesaurus construction. Materials on which Society members work go beyond the standard trade or scholarly monograph to include archives, correspondence, legal and medical materials, maps, style guides, and Web sites. And subjects in which Society members specialize run the gamut from art, history, literature, music, political science, psychology, and sociology to alternative medicine, aviation, Canada’s First Nations, community activism, ethics, folklore, home improvement, oceanography, and popular culture.

== Conferences and events ==
The Society holds its conference and annual general meeting in a different Canadian city each year. The Society has also held joint conferences with its sister organization in the United States, the American Society for Indexing (ASI).

=== International representation ===
The Society actively participates in international indexing matters, sending a representative to the annual Society of Indexers conference, as well as to the ASI conference if possible. It is also represented on The Indexer’s international board.
