= Xindy =

xindy is a flexible program for sorting and formatting book indexes. It was written by Joachim Schrod as a successor to MakeIndex. xindy supports indexing for a variety of programs, including especially LaTeX and troff, and produces complex indices of the data.

xindy is cited as one of the most widely used indexing programs for LaTeX. Unlike MakeIndex, xindy features strong support for many languages in addition to English, and many standard character encodings including Unicode.

xindy is licensed under the GNU GPL.
