= Surname stroke order =

System for ordering Chinese surnames

The surname stroke order (Chinese: 姓氏笔划排序) is a system for the collation of Chinese surnames. It arose as an impartial method of categorization of the order in which names appear in official documentation or in ceremonial procedure without any line of hierarchy. In official setting, the number of strokes in a person's surname determines where a name should be placed and the list order. Surnames "Ding" and "Wang" (written simply in the Chinese language with two and four strokes, respectively, "丁", "王") for example, are simple surnames that usually appear on the front of lists, while surnames such as "Dai" and "Wei" ("戴", "魏", both written with 17 strokes) often appear on the bottom of lists.

If the first character is the same, then the names are ordered by the stroke on the second character. In some naming lists, names with two characters appear before names with three characters. In other naming lists, the second character takes precedence regardless of how many characters there are in total in the name. If there are equal number of strokes in a surname, they are then ordered by the order of the way strokes are formed, starting with the first stroke, with a horizontal stroke ordering first, then a vertical stroke, then a downwards right-to-left stroke, then a point, then a hook (Chinese: 橫竖撇捺折).

Although this ordering method is widely used, its most prominent use is in the ordering of important official bodies, including the members of the Central Committee of the Chinese Communist Party, the members of the National People's Congress, and the members of the Chinese People's Political Consultative Conference.

The ordering method is comparable to an alphabetical order of names, but in Chinese this is impractical as written Chinese lacks an alphabetical structure, and the general populace does not rely on the pinyin romanization, from which some order schemes have developed.

The parade of nations at the 2008 Beijing Olympics used a similar ordering method.

== See also ==
- Chinese name
- Radical-and-stroke sorting
