= Johann Sigismund Kusser =

Baroque composer active in Germany, France, and Ireland

Johann Sigismund Kusser or Cousser (baptized 13 February 1660 – before 17 November 1727) was a composer born in the Kingdom of Hungary who was active in Germany, France, and Ireland.

== Life ==
The son of Johann Kusser, a Protestant cantor in Pressburg (then in the Kingdom of Hungary), Johann Sigismund and his parents moved to Stuttgart in 1674 because of religious persecution. Two years later he went to spend six years in Paris and the Palace of Versailles. There he met the French court composer Jean-Baptiste Lully and learned from him how to compose in the French style. Kusser was then employed at the princely courts in Baden-Baden and Ansbach, before taking a trip to Germany in October 1683.

In 1690 he became the first Kapellmeister of the Opernhaus am Hagenmarkt in Braunschweig. In the following years, he married Hedwig Melusine von Damm, daughter of a local Ratsherr. Their daughter Auguste Elisabeth married the Braunschweig historian Philipp Julius Rehtmeyer. During his time there, Kusser wrote eight operas, enriching the Italian-influenced repertoire. Disagreements in 1694 with the librettist and court poet Friedrich Christian Bressand led Kusser to move to the Oper am Gänsemarkt in Hamburg. He then left Hamburg at the end of 1695 and, after spells working in Nuremberg and Augsburg, took a post at the court of Eberhard Louis, Duke of Württemberg in 1699, being made Hofkapellmeister there the following year.

At the end of 1704, he moved to London as a composer and private music teacher. In 1707 he went to Dublin and in 1711 was made Chapel-Master of Trinity College Dublin. He was then appointed "Chief Composer" and "Master of the Musick, attending His Majesty's State in Ireland" in 1716, dying in Dublin in 1727. His tasks included the composition of annual birthday odes for the English king and other festive occasions; his Dublin serenatas were staged like semi-operas. Kusser's works are now rarely played, but he influenced the following generation of composers, such as Reinhard Keiser, Johann Mattheson, Georg Philipp Telemann, Christoph Graupner, Georg Caspar Schürmann and George Frideric Handel.

== Selected works ==
=== Instrumental works ===
- Composition de Musique (1682), a collection of overtures
- Three collections of suites: Apollon Enjoüé, Festin des Muses and La cicala della cetra d'eunomio (1700)

=== Stage works ===
- Cleopatra (Libretto presumed to be by Friedrich Christian Bressand after Giacomo Francesco Bussani, Giulio Cesare in Egitto), opera in a prologue and three acts (premiered Braunschweig, 4 February 1690)
- Julia (Braunschweig?), opera in 3 acts (Braunschweig, 1690)
- La Grotta di Salzdahl (Flaminio Parisetti), divertimento 1 act (Braunschweig, 1 January 1691)
- Narcissus (Gottlieb Fiedler), opera in a prologue and 3 acts (Braunschweig, 4 October 1692; Kusser is referred to on the libretto [Hamburg, 1692] as Ober-Capellmeister)
- Andromeda, Singspiel 3 acts (Braunschweig, 1692)
- Ariadne (Bressand), opera 5 acts (Braunschweig, 15 December 1692)
- Jason (Bressand), Singspiel 5 acts (Braunschweig, 1 September 1692)
- Porus (Bressand, after Jean Racine), Singspiel in 5 acts (Braunschweig, 1693); reworked by Christian Heinrich Postel and put on in Hamburg in 1694 as Der durch Groß-Muth und Tapfferkeit besiegte Porus under Kusser's direction
- Erindo, oder Die unsträfliche Liebe (Bressand), Schäferspiel 3 acts (Hamburg, 1694)
- Der großmütige Scipio Africanus (Fiedler, after Nicolò Minato), opera in 3 acts (Hamburg, 1694)
- Pyramus und Thisbe getreue und festverbundene Liebe (C. Schröder), opera with prologue (possibly never staged)
- Der verliebte Wald, Singspiel in 1 act (Stuttgart)
- Gensericus, als Rom und Karthagens Überwinder (Postel), opera (Hamburg, 1694?); dubious attribution, possibly even by Johann Georg Conradi
- The Man of Mode (play by George Etherege) (London: Little Lincoln's Inn Fields, 9 February 1705)
- Adonis (score dated 1699 or 1700 found in State Library of Württemberg by Dr Samantha Owens, c.2015)

== Bibliography ==
- Harold E. Samuel: "A German Musician Comes to London in 1704", in Music & Letters, vol. 62 (1981), pp. 591–593.
- Brian Boydell: A Dublin Musical Calendar, 1700–1760 (Blackrock: Irish Academic Press, 1988)
- Hans Joachim Marx: "Eine wiederaufgefundene Serenata theatrale von John Sigismond Cousser und ihr politischer Kontext", in Rudolf Eller zum Achtzigsten: Ehrenkolloquium zum 80. Geburtstag von Prof. em. Dr Rudolf Eller am 9. Mai 1994, ed. Heller & Waczkat (Rostock, 1994), pp. 33–40.
- Samantha Owens: "The Stuttgart Adonis: A Recently Rediscovered Opera by Johann Sigismund Cousser?", in The Musical Times, vol. 147 (2006), pp. 67–80.
- Samantha Owens: "Johann Sigismund Cousser, William III and the Serenata in Early Eighteenth-Century Dublin", in Eighteenth-Century Music, vol. 6 (2009), pp. 7–40.
- Samantha Owens: The Well-Travelled Musician. John Sigismond Cousser and Musical Exchange in Baroque Europe (Woodbridge: The Boydell Press, 2017), ISBN 978-1-78327-234-1.
