= Natural sort order =

Ordering of strings in alphabetical order with numeric value consideration

In computing, natural sort order (or natural sorting) is a way of ordering strings that treats embedded numbers as whole numerical values rather than sequences of characters.

While standard alphabetical order compares strings character-by-character (where "10" sorts before "2" because "1" is less than "2"), natural sort order orders them by magnitude of the number, placing "2" before "10".

Natural sort order is designed to address the shortcoming of standard lexicographical order, which often produces counter-intuitive results for humans when dealing with numbered lists, filenames, or version numbers.

Natural	Lexicographical
1.jpg 2.jpg 3.jpg 9.jpg 10.jpg 11.jpg	1.jpg 10.jpg 11.jpg 2.jpg 3.jpg 9.jpg

== Problem with standard sorting ==
In standard alphabetical (lexicographical) sorting, strings are compared character by character from left to right. This causes numbers to be sorted based on the value of their first digit, rather than their whole numerical value.

For example, a computer using standard sorting will place the string "11" before "2". This occurs because the character "1" (the first digit of 11) has a lower code value than "2". While mathematically correct in terms of character codes, this ordering disrupts the logical sequence expected by users, particularly in file management and data lists.

== Operation ==
Natural sorting algorithms generally operate by splitting strings into "chunks" of text and numbers.

- Text chunks are compared alphabetically (often case-insensitively).
- Numeric chunks are parsed into integer values and compared numerically.

=== Comparison of algorithms ===
Standard Sorting (Lexicographical)	Natural Sorting
file1.txt file10.txt file11.txt file12.txt file2.txt file20.txt file3.txt	file1.txt file2.txt file3.txt file10.txt file11.txt file12.txt file20.txt

=== Handling edge cases ===
Different implementations of natural sort may handle edge cases differently:

- Leading zeros: Some algorithms treat "01" and "1" as identical, while others may enforce an ordering where "01" follows "1" (or vice versa) to ensure a deterministic sort.
- Whitespace: Most implementations ignore leading or trailing whitespace around the numbers to prevent sorting anomalies.
- Decimals and Version Numbers: A variation of natural sort, often called version sort, is designed to handle multiple numeric segments separated by dots (e.g., 1.2.10 vs 1.2.2). In standard sort, 1.2.10 precedes 1.2.2; in version sort, the segments are parsed individually, correctly placing 1.2.10 after 1.2.2.

== History and implementations ==
Functionality to sort by natural sort order is now widely available in software libraries for many programming languages and operating systems.

The concept gained significant visibility in the Macintosh community. During the 1996 MacHack conference, the Natural Order Mac OS System Extension was conceived and implemented overnight as an entry for the Best Hack contest. Subsequently, Dave Koelle published the "Alphanum Algorithm" in 1997, a popular reference implementation that influenced many later libraries. Martin Pool published "Natural Order String Comparison" in 2000.

Modern implementations include:

- Dart: In the collection package there are many sort algorithms, and one of them is compareNatural.
- PHP: The natsort() function is built into the standard library.
- Python: The natsort library is a widely used third-party package.
- Perl: The module Sort::Naturally is available via CPAN.
- Unix/Linux: The GNU ls and sort commands support natural sorting via the -v (version sort) flag (for ls) or the -V flag (for sort).
- .NET/C#: Various extensions exist, such as NaturalSort.Extension.

File managers such as Windows Explorer (since Windows XP) and Midnight Commander utilize natural sorting by default to display file lists.

== See also ==
- Collation
- Lexicographical order
- ISO 8601
- Semantic versioning
