= ISO 999 =

ISO standard

ISO 999 (Information and documentation—Guidelines for the content, organization and presentation of indexes) is an ISO standard which provides the information industry with guidelines for the content, organisation and presentation of indexes to a wide range of documents including books, periodicals, electronic documents, films, images, maps, and three-dimensional objects. It covers the choice and form of headings and subheadings used in index entries once the subjects to be indexed have been determined.

== Revision ==
- ISO 999:1975
- ISO 999:1996

ISO999:1996 is a complete revision and expansion of the first (1975) edition of this International Standard on indexes. It was prepared by ISO Technical Committee (TC) 46, Subcommittee (SC) 9 which develops International Standards for the identification and description of information resources.
