= Hazel K. Bell =

English indexer, editor, and writer

- Born: Hazel Kathleen MacAulife; 5 December 1935 (age 90)
- Occupation: Indexer
- Education: University of Reading

Hazel K. Bell is an indexer, editor and writer. Bell was editor of The Indexer and Learned Publishing journals. She has created nearly 900 book indexes and has also written and edited several books.

Bell received the Carey Award for services to indexing in 1997 and has been awarded the Wheatley Medal of the Society of Indexers for an outstanding index twice in 2005 and 2006.

== Life ==
Hazel Kathleen Bell (née MacAulife) was born on 5 December 1935 in Feltham, UK. She studied at the University of Reading. She started freelancing for publishers while raising her children and has created nearly 900 book indexes. Bell was editor of Society of Indexers' The Indexer journal from 1978 to 1995 and editor of Learned Publishing journal (Association of Learned and Professional Society Publishers) from 1984 to 1996. She received the Carey Award for services to indexing in 1997 and has been awarded the Wheatley Medal of the Society of Indexers for an outstanding index twice in 2005 and 2006.

== Publications ==
Books written and edited by Hazel K. Bell include:

- From Flock Beds to Professionalism: A History of Index-makers (2008).
- Indexers and Indexes in Fact and Fiction (2001).
- Indexing Biographies and Other Stories of Human Lives (2020).
