= Society of Indexers =

UK organization for the indexing profession

The Society of Indexers (SI) is a professional society of indexers based in the UK, with its offices in Sheffield, England, but has members worldwide. The society was established in 1957, while its quarterly journal, The Indexer has been published since 1958.

== History ==
The Society of Indexers was formally constituted at the premises of the National Book League in the UK on 30 March 1957 by G. Norman Knight and approximately 60 other people. He "count[ed] it as one of the achievements of the Society to have removed the intense feeling of solitude in which the indexer (of books and journals, at any rate) used to work."

Later members in various areas of the world grouped together and formed societies which are now affiliated:

- American Society for Indexing
- Indexing Society of Canada
- Australian and New Zealand Society of Indexers
- China Society of Indexers

== Description ==
The Society of Indexers exists to promote indexing, the quality of indexes and the profession of indexing. It provides a distance training course in indexing leading to its qualification of Professional Member. Further professional experience leads to Advanced Professional Member and beyond that the qualification of Fellow of the Society is awarded for proof of experience and index quality.

Its online directory of professional indexers lists qualified members available to take freelance indexing work.

== Publications ==
The Society started publishing its journal, The Indexer, subtitled The International Journal of Indexing, ISSN 0019-4131 (print) ISSN 1756-0632 (online), in 1958. Initially published biannually, it moved to quarterly publication in 2008. From 2019 it has been published by Liverpool University Press. Publication continues as of 2022, It is the official journal of all the indexing societies. All editions are available online, and as of 2022 the editor is Mary Coe. Past editors include Maureen MacGlashan and Hazel K. Bell.

The society newsletter SIdelights is published quarterly and is only available to society members.
