= Head of Bhairava =

16th century mask from Nepal's Malla period

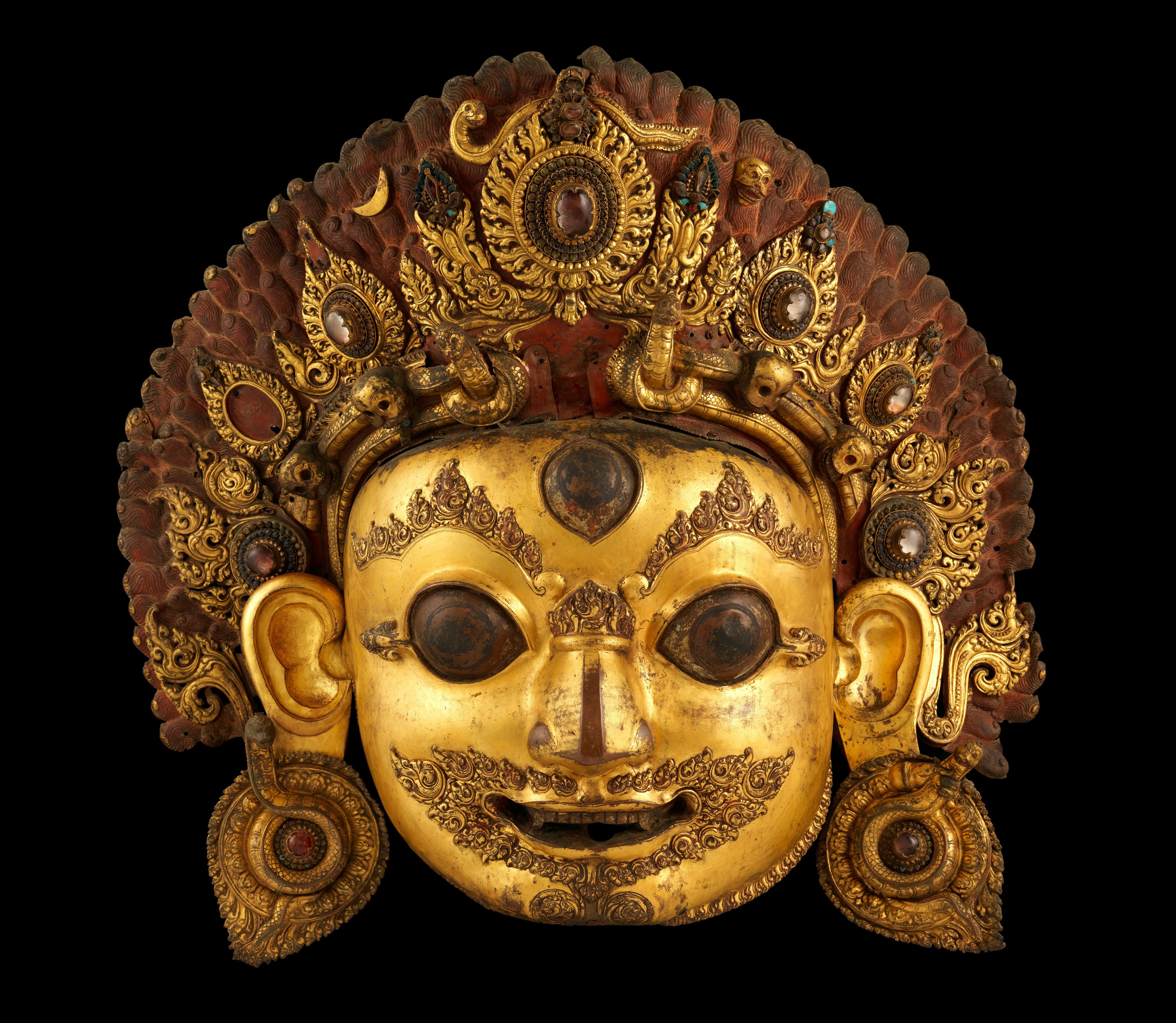
- Year: 16th century AD (Malla period)
- Type: sculpture
- Medium: Gilt copper with rock crystal and paint
- Dimensions: 81.3 cm × 91.4 cm (32.0 in × 36.0 in)
- Location: Metropolitan Museum of Art, New York
- Accession: 2012.444.2

The Head of Bhairava is a 16th-century mask from the Malla dynasty of Nepal that depicts the deity Bhairava. It was originally found in the Kathmandu Valley of Nepal and is currently held as part of the Zimmerman Family Collection at the Metropolitan Museum of Art in New York City.

This mask is made of gilt copper with rock crystal, is painted, and is ornamented with a diadem and earrings. The mask was missing its right ear when it was acquired by the Metropolitan Museum of Art in 2012, so they created a new ear from a different material.

Bhairava appears in several South Asian religions, including Hindu mythology, and is associated with destruction and rage.

== Background ==
Bhairava is considered to be a manifestation of the god Shiva. He is often depicted as a terrifying god in Hinduism, and can also be seen in some Buddhist schools and in Jainism. He is believed to have nine faces and 34 hands, and appearing as a black naked figure. Literally, Bhairava means ferociousness or terror.

The Newar people in Nepal have worshipped Bhairava as an important deity. This can be seen in the surviving Bhairava temples in Nepal.

== Description ==
The mask is dated to the Malla period of the 16th century, based on its similarity to an inscribed example that is dated to 1560. It was found in the Kathmandu Valley of Nepal. Its distinct craftsmanship suggests that it was made by the Newar people.

The mask is made of gilt and polychrome copper. It depicts Bhairava as having flames in place of hair, including for the eyebrows, around the mouth, and atop the head. The hair atop the head is colored red. It has earrings that are shaped like entwined serpents. It also has a diadem decorated with snakes, as well as skulls and inset crystals. The mask has a small hole in the mouth, which was used to dispense beer to devotees during the annual Indrayatra festival.

=== Acquisition and restoration by the Met ===
It was given to the Metropolitan Museum of Art (colloquially "the Met") in New York City from the private collection of Jack and Muriel Zimmerman in 2012. Before the Met conducted conservation work, the mask was missing its right ear. The left earring had been placed where the right ear was as a substitute. John Guy, curator of the South and Southeast Asian art at the Met, was among those who decided to restore the mask.

They made a prototype of the ear with modeling clay, then made a silicone-rubber mold, using materials normally used in creating dental impressions. They then carefully tested and selected a new material that they believed would have a minimal chemical- and weight-impact on the rest of the mask. The material was made in a putty-like substance and put into the mold. After it dried, it was decorated and painted to aesthetically blend in with the rest of the mask.
