= Elkhart University =

- Former names: Elkhart Business University; Elkhart University of Medical and Dental Technique; Elkhart Institute of Technology
- Type: Private for-profit medical
- Active: 1882–1986
- Founders: H. A. Mumaw
- Accreditation: Indiana Commission for Post Secondary Proprietary Education
- Location: 516 S. Main St, Elkhart, Indiana, United States; 41.6830°N 85.9710°W

Elkhart University is a former school of medical and dental laboratory technologies. It was founded in 1882 in Elkhart, Indiana by H. A. Mumaw as a proprietary school.

== History ==
The university was fully accredited by the Indiana Commission for Post Secondary Proprietary Education, and graduates of the medical laboratory technology curriculum were eligible to take the American Medical Technologist Registry examination. It closed in 1986. The university went through several name changes before it closed. It was called "Elkhart Business University" in 1882, "Elkhart University of Medical and Dental Technique" in the 1950s, and "Elkhart Institute of Technology" in the 1960s. In 1917, Mumaw, the founder of the university, sold the institution to Ira Elliot, who was the president until 1938. Financial difficulties caused Elkhart University to close down after operating for 104 years.
