= Pivot tooth =

Fixed dental prosthesis

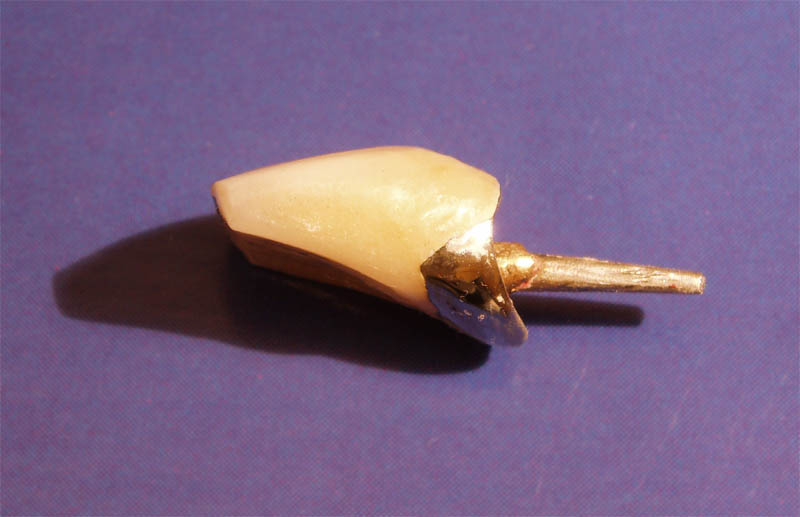
Pivot tooth with a ferrule

The pivot tooth is a fixed dental prosthesis used to rebuild a tooth. It is a type of crown-root foundation, but it is an independent supplement and usually consists of a pin or peg and a full crown permanently connected (i.e., without cement) and placed in the patient's oral cavity during a single visit. It often includes a protective element called a ferrule.

Pivot teeth were developed to shorten the execution cycle and skip some laboratory steps. Although they could last for many years when used according to indications and contraindications, pivot teeth did not meet the requirements and are no longer used. Better results are achieved by permanently cementing the crown-root foundation and further crafting the crown as if it were a natural tooth stump prepared for the crown. Otherwise, the laboratory connection of the crown to the foundation carries a greater risk of inaccuracies, subsequent crown leakage, cement washout, and tooth decay.

== History ==
At the turn of the 18th and 19th centuries, dentists made the first attempts to replace single tooth gaps using pegs anchored in the root canal of the tooth. However, due to the lack of appropriate dental cements or adhesives, they were fastened on gold or platinum foil, as well as linen, cotton, and silk. Recommendations from individual scientists (L. Koecker, B. Rush, T. Kaczorowski) quickly emerged to first treat the tooth root due to the odontogenic focal infection theory.

In the mid-19th century, new methods of pin fixation emerged: a gold pin on gold foil (Gustav Blume, 1850) and on gutta-percha (J. Taft, 1859). In 1880, Casius M. Richmond patented the pivot tooth with a ferrule and his own porcelain firing method. At the same time, pivot teeth by Marshall L. Logan gained significant popularity.

Regardless of the development of pivot teeth, the technique of restoring a tooth with a full crown on the stump of the patient's own tooth developed independently, which is still used today.

== Structure ==
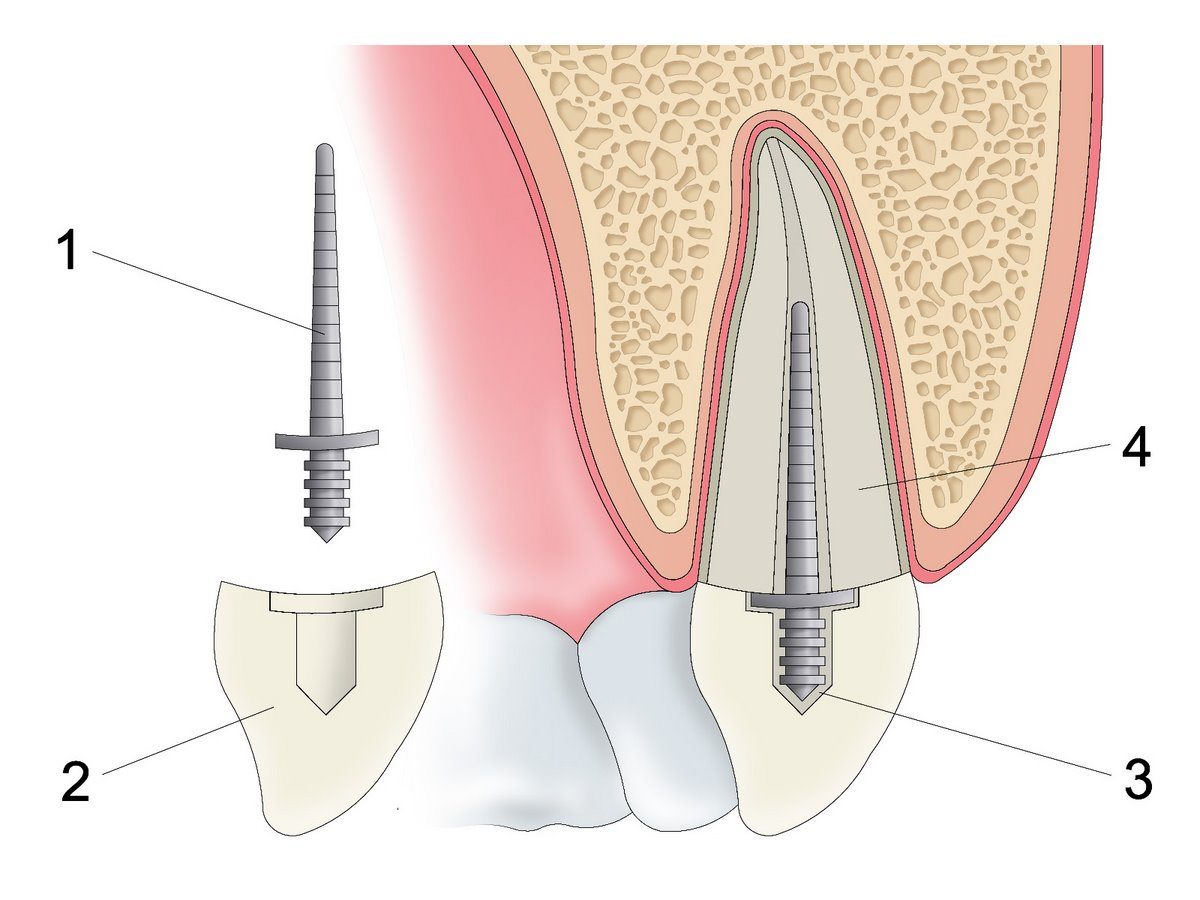
Davis pivot tooth without a ferrule to secure the root; the pin (1) is fixed in the root of the tooth (4) and then a crown (2) is attached using dental cement (3)

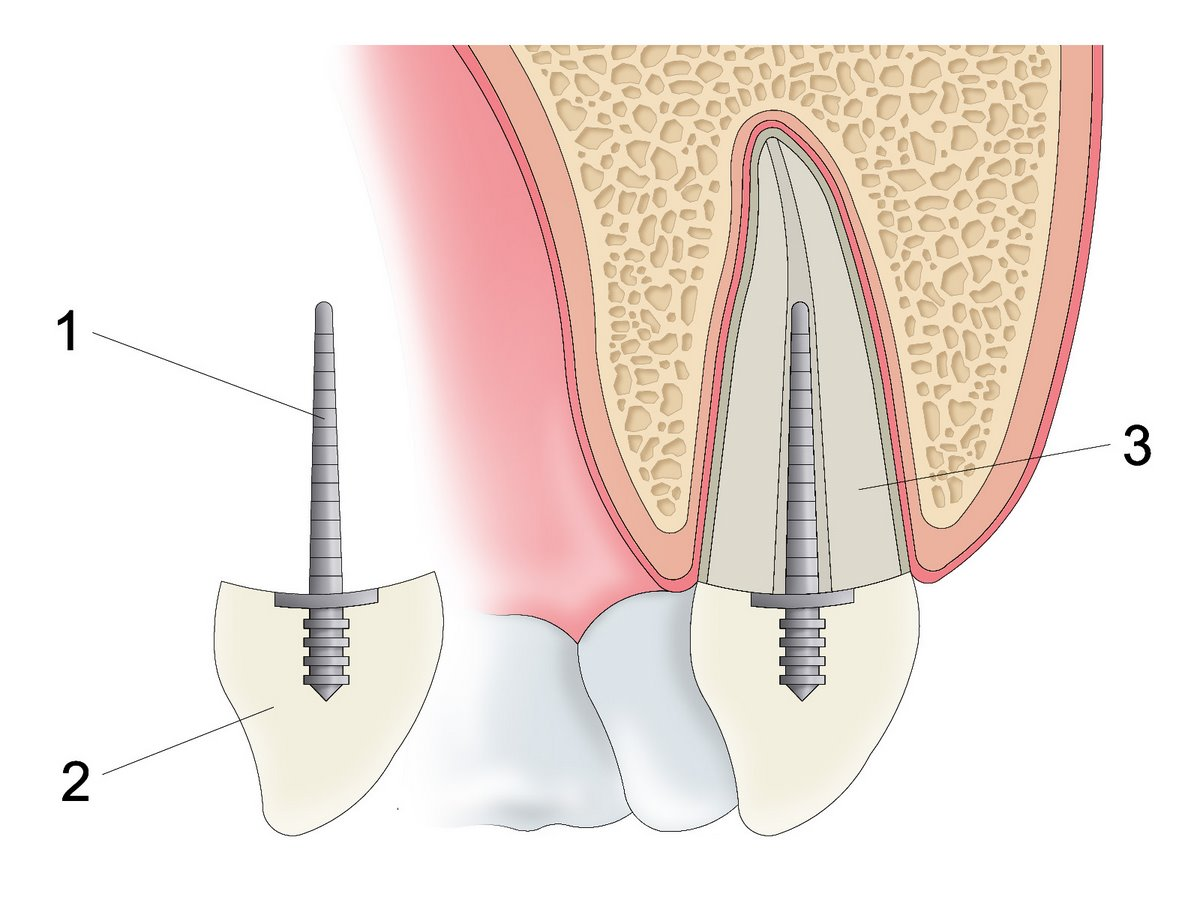
Logan pivot tooth without a root protection element; the factory-connected pin (1) and crown (2) are fixed as a unit in the tooth root (3)

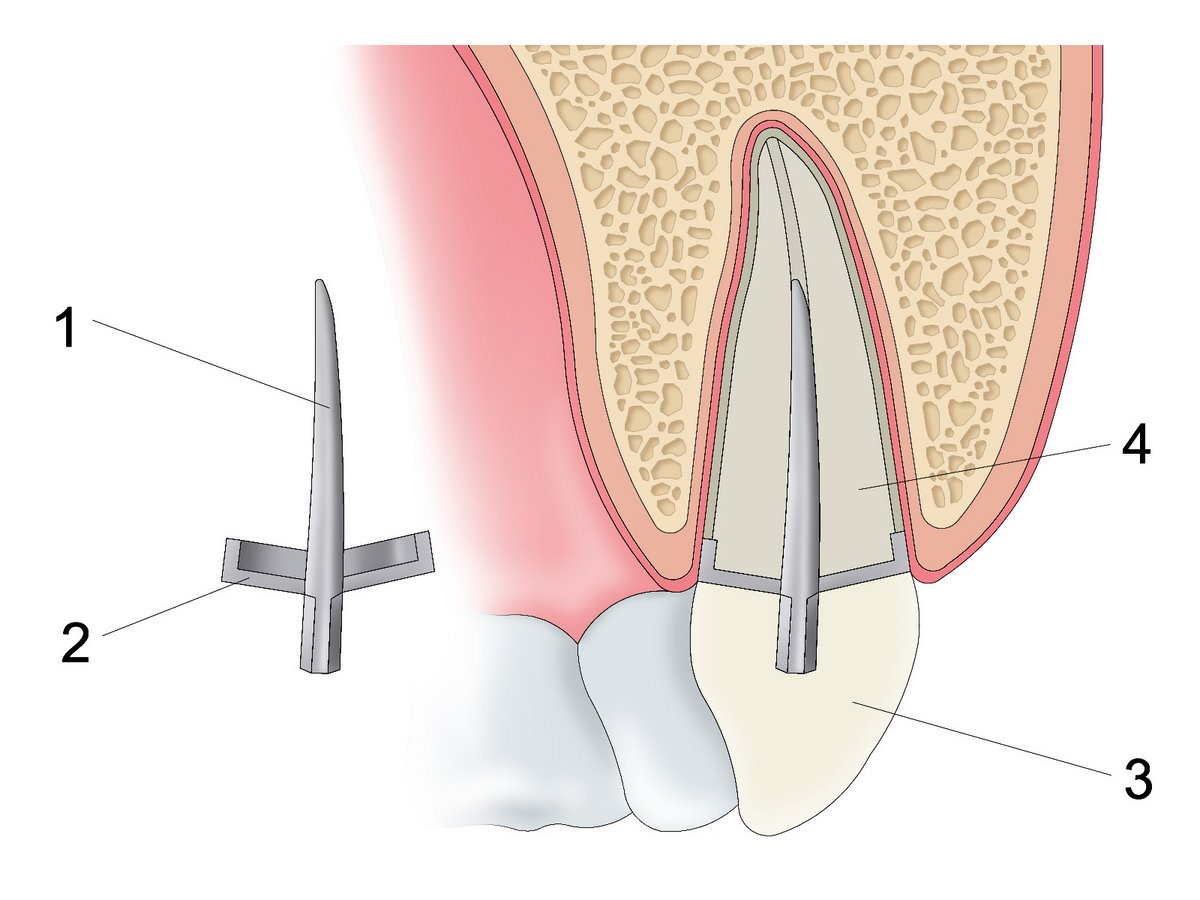
Richmond pivot tooth with a ferrule (2) securing the root (4)

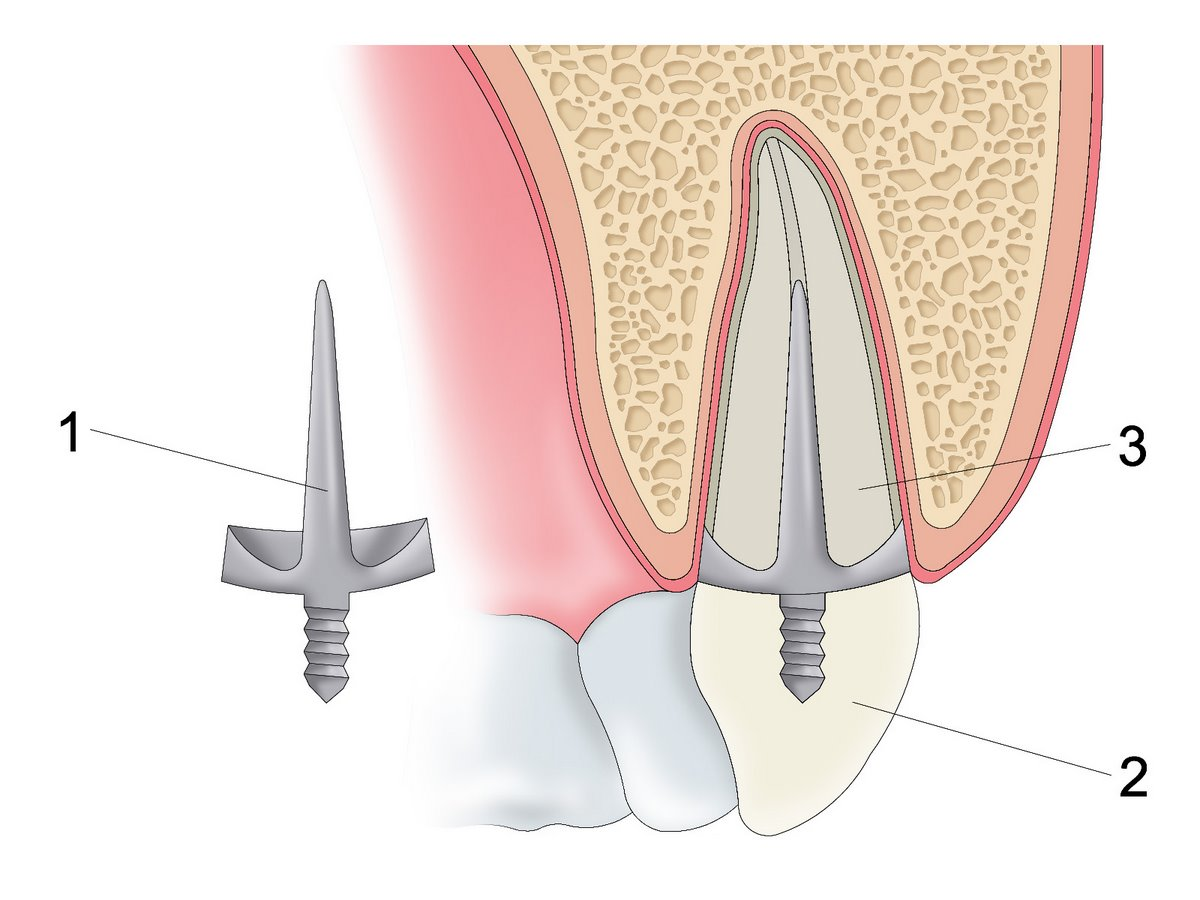
Schröder pivot tooth – pin and ferrule (1) securing the root (3) cast as one piece

A pivot tooth consists of a pin inserted into a prepared root canal of the tooth and a complete prosthetic crown permanently attached to this pin, rebuilding the entire tooth crown. Some pivot teeth have a third element, called a ferrule, which is a root cap protecting the supportive surface of the root from decay. Depending on the presence of this ferrule, pivot teeth can be divided into two groups:

- Without protection of the root supportive surface – pivot teeth with a porcelain crown (e.g., Davis pivot tooth, Logan pivot tooth) or with an acrylic crown. In the Davis pivot tooth, the crown is not previously permanently attached to the pin. The dentist applies it to the pin during the same visit when the pin is cemented into the patient's tooth.
- With protection of the root supportive surface – pivot teeth with a Richmond ferrule (e.g., Richmond pivot tooth, invented by Casius M. Richmond in 1880) or a Schröder ferrule (e.g., Schrödera pivot tooth), used with an acrylic crown, metal-acrylic composite crown, or metal-porcelain crown. The ferrule is used to protect the tooth from decay, from mechanical injury in the case of a deep bite, and in case it's necessary to connect the pivot tooth with metal parts of further prosthetic elements.

The pin is typically metal – platinum (formerly) or steel under a porcelain crown, 18-karat gold, gold-platinum alloy, or steel under an acrylic crown. The Richmond ferrule consists of gold components (18 or 22 karats) and gold solder (18 or 20 karats respectively); the Schröder ferrule consists of 20-karat gold, a gold-platinum alloy, or chromium-nickel steel. The crown can be metal, acrylic, composite, or porcelain.

== Indications and contraindications ==
Indications for performing a pivot tooth mostly overlap with today's indications for full crowns: destruction of the tooth crown (due to decay or trauma), concern about mechanical damage (numerous fillings with thin walls), pathological changes in enamel (discoloration, erosion, Hutchinson's teeth), and anchoring for a bridge.

Pivot teeth without a ferrule are indicated when there is no tendency for decay, the root of the tooth is intact, and in a simple or deep bite where the front teeth (upper and lower) do not touch each other.

They can be used in all teeth except molars. It is important to relieve the incisal edges of the pivot teeth and consider using this restoration in a deep bite.

== Workmanship ==
=== Without protection of the root supportive surface ===
Preparation of a tooth for pivot teeth is similar for each type, but there may be slight deviations from the general scheme due to differences in structure. After endodontic treatment of the abutment tooth, its canal is prepared using a round bur, up to 1.5 mm in diameter in upper central incisors and canines, and 1.3 mm in other teeth. The root surface is then cut with a carborundum stone in a slanted manner, with a mid-root groove, ensuring better force distribution than horizontal cuts.

Next, the dentist selects a prefabricated porcelain crown, paying attention to color, shape, and size. After fitting, the restoration is cemented in the abutment tooth (for Davis-type pivot tooth, the post is first cemented, followed by crown placement).

The dentist may also fabricate an acrylic crown (acrylic, unlike porcelain, exhibits physiological wear), by modeling it with white wax in the patient's mouth and sending it with the pin to the dental laboratory, where a ready-made pivot tooth is obtained. This is called the direct method. Alternatively, the indirect method can be used. The dentist should record the occlusion with the post in the canal, take an impression including the post and adjacent teeth, an impression of opposing teeth, choose the color of the future crown, and provide the data to the dental laboratory. There, under laboratory conditions, in the case of the indirect method, the technician first models a wax crown on the pin, and then (in both methods) casting and direct mechanical connection of the crown with the coronal part of the post, i.e., without using cement, through soldering and polymerization. The dental technician then trims, polishes, and provides the dentist with the finished crown permanently attached to the pivot tooth. The entire procedure is completed and cemented in the patient's mouth during one visit.

=== With protection of the root supportive surface ===
In the case of a Richmond pivot tooth, the abutment tooth is trimmed to a height of 2–3 mm above the gum line and prepared as for a subgingival metal crown. A subgingival ring for the ferrule is created, descending 1–1.5 mm below the gum line, fitted to the prepared crown just like a metal crown ring. Next, the abutment tooth is shaped with a roof-like slant (with the lingual part trimmed horizontally) up to the level of the prepared tooth edges, and the ferrule is fitted to the bottom of the prepared tooth. An opening is made in the bottom of the post for the pin, which is then inserted and soldered.

If the root structure is damaged by decay, a cast Schröder ferrule can be used. The tooth is cleaned of decay, attempting to preserve the oval shape of the canal and a roof-like finish of the supporting surface, although this surface is typically irregular after preparation. Then, the pin is fitted, and damaged root tissues are reconstructed with wax, and the data is sent to the dental laboratory, where the entire structure is cast in metal.

After fitting the ferrule in the patient's mouth, the dentist takes impressions, registers the occlusion, and sends the data to the technician. The technician models the crown in wax and then converts it to acrylic (if the pivot tooth is to be a standalone restoration) or fabricates a composite crown (metal-acrylic or metal-porcelain) if integration with further prosthetic components is required. Finally, the pivot tooth is cemented in the patient's mouth during the last visit.

== Bibliography ==
- Majewski, Stanisław Władysław (2005). Rekonstrukcja zębów uzupełnieniami stałymi: Podręcznik dla studentów i lekarzy. Kraków: Wydawnictwo Fundacji Rozwoju Protetyki.
- Galasińska-Landsbergerowa, Janina (1980). Protetyka stomatologiczna: Podręcznik dla studentów stomatologii. Warsaw: PZWL. ISBN 83-200-0234-6.
