= Dental technician =

Technician working on dental appliances

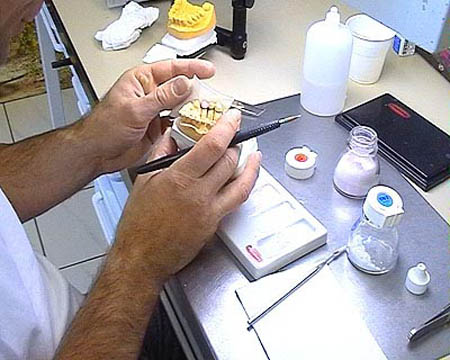
- Dental technician building porcelain dental bridge

Occupation
- Occupation type: Technician

Description
- Fields of employment: Dentistry
- Related jobs: Dentist

A dental technician is a member of the dental team who, upon prescription from a dental clinician, constructs custom-made restorative and dental appliances.

There are four major disciplines within dental technology. These are fixed prosthesis including crowns, bridges and implants; removable prosthesis, including dentures and removable partial dentures; maxillofacial prosthesis, including ocular prosthesis and craniofacial prosthesis; and orthodontics and auxiliaries, including orthodontic appliances and mouthguards.

The dentist communicates with the dental technician with prescriptions, drawings, and measurements taken from the patient. The most important aspect of this is a dental impression into which the technician flows a gypsum dental stone to create a replica of the patient's anatomy known as a dental cast. A technician can then use this cast for the construction of custom appliances.

== Fixed restorations ==
A fixed dental restoration is an appliance designed to replace a tooth or teeth that may have been lost or damaged by injury, caries or other oral diseases. These restorations are distinguished from other restorations by the fact that once they have been placed by a dentist the patient can not remove them.

Such restorations include crowns, bridges, veneers, fixed implant restorations, pivot teeth, inlays and onlays.

== Removable restorations ==
Removable restorations are dental appliances to replace one or more teeth that have been completely lost. These restorations ideally remain stable in normal function but can be removed by the patient for cleaning and at night. Removable restorations are either retained by the patients soft tissue as in full dentures, anchored and stabilized by other teeth as with partial dentures and overdentures or on implant attachments as with implant-retained overdentures and partial dentures.

== Orthodontics ==
Orthodontic technicians make removable orthodontic appliances with wires, springs, and screws on prescription from an orthodontist to either move teeth to form a more harmonious occlusion and aesthetic appearance of teeth or to maintain the position of previously moved teeth.

== Specialization ==
Training to become a dental technician requires a combination of academic study as well as experience gained from working on the job. Therefore, regardless of the country that they are from, after becoming a qualified technician (so long as the title of “dental technician” exists there) one has finished their studies, but not their training since these crafts take years of experience to master.

Depending on the position held by the dental technician, their specific title could differ as well (“ceramicist”, “polisher”, “orthodontist”, etc.). In fact, due to the complexity of the work that is carried out by dental technicians, a professional generally specializes in one field of dental prosthesis. Since the range of devices to design and create is extremely varied, it would be impossible to make all of them with the same set of skills, further, to completely master any technique may require years of experience.

In general, the first step a dental technician makes is to “master the plaster”, meaning that they first start in the part of the lab where dental impressions are made, cutting models, and mounting articulators. The dental technician may acquire the ability to carry out various and disparate tasks in the lab, being able to even execute most steps in the production of various prosthetics, such as removable partial dentures, complete and partially made of resin, and orthodontic devices (including braces and retainers). Nevertheless, as mentioned previously, dental technicians need to specialize; in fact, there are many specific dental labs that exist for each and every type of prosthesis.

The distinct specialties are described below:

=== Polisher ===
A polisher is a dental technician who dedicates themselves to the setup of teeth, either in making removable prosthetics made of resin or metal, molding the neck of the tooth, or loading the resin. Within their profession, they can also be referred to as a waxer.

=== Metalworker ===
A metalworker is a dental technician who is in charge of casting dental rods, which means they mold the metal and obtain the metallic frames for fixed prostheses, similar to the removable prosthetics made of resin. They are also in charge of processing and reworking said metal. These professionals can also be in charge of designing the wax patterns of removable metallic prostheses, such as the copings of crowns and fixed bridges. Among other things, this depends on the dental technician and the lab in which they work.

=== Prosthetic orthodontists ===
It is very common to differentiate a prosthetist who works with removable orthodontics, as it is normal to find professionals who specialize in this field. Removable equipment consists of a variety of different devices, each with specific naming and characteristics. Prosthetic orthodontists should be both agile and precise when handling different pliers and manipulating wires.

=== Ceramicist ===
A ceramicist is a dental physician who has specialized in the final stage of making fixed prosthetics, which consists of the assembly of ceramic on different prosthetic structures such as: bridges, crowns, prosthetic implants or prosthetic attachments. This technique is complex and requires artistic talent, so much so that dental technicians can achieve different levels of ability, developing their creativity to a greater or lesser extent to give your teeth the most natural look possible. As such, ceramicists are often considered valued professionals.

== Products ==
Dental technicians predominantly make dentures, or similarly, create artificial parts that are intended to basically replace the natural, missing teeth of the patient.

Therefore, dental technicians make complete resin prosthetics (commonly called dentures), partial prosthetics (being metallic or made of resin), bridges and crowns of any type (fixed prosthetics, also called dental implants), and mixed prosthetic devices. Further, dental technicians also make all removable orthodontic devices (removable orthodontics), dental splints, individual compression trays, temporary resin prosthetics, bite plates, as well as study models. Dental technicians are also in charge of making composites (the repairing of prosthetics in case they break) and relining (the readjustment of prosthetics when they are too big or become flimsy in the mouth due to the reabsorption of alveolar bone over time). All of these, concerning the plaster models or instructor models, being a crime that acts on the patient's mouth.

In every country that legally regulates the profession of dental technicians, the prosthetist is the only professional trained and authorized by law to make the previously mentioned products.

By law, dental technicians can never, even if there is a medical prescription, take impressions- the client of the prosthetists is legally the dentist, and it is considered an intrusive crime by the Penal Code if a prosthetist touches the mouth of the patient.

== Objectives ==
The goal of a dental technician can be summarized as restoring functionality, health, and aesthetic of the mouth.

The only goal of a prosthetist is not just to create a prosthetic, but rather to restore the loss of functionality of a patient's mouth, from mastication and swallowing to speaking and correct phonetics. Through the work of a prosthetist, a patient's oral health, mechanical function, hygiene, and comfort are revamped, including the aesthetic of the mouth and face.

This objective is a combined effort between clinical and lab members, an effort that is, in part, coordinated and achieved by the dentist and the prosthetist. That said, the only one in charge of the creation of prosthetics is the prosthetist, being a handcrafted, personalized, unique item designed in the dental lab.

== Commemorative days ==
- March 7 - Dental Technician Day in Spain
- March 19 - Dental Technician Day in Costa Rica
- March 24 - Dental Technician Day in Buenos Aires, Argentina
- March 24 - Dental Technician Day in Uruguay
- May 6 - Dental Laboratory Technician in Chile
- The Entire Month of June - Dental Technician Appreciation Day and Certified Dental Technicians (CDTs) in United States of America
- First Friday of June - Dental Technician Day in Europe
- December 4 - Oral Health Professions Day in Peru
- September 24 - Dental Technologists Day in Japan
- October 8 - Dental Technician Day in Venezuela
- October 27 - Dental Technician Day in Colombia

== See also ==
- Dentistry
- Dental auxiliary
  - Dental assistant
  - Dental therapist
  - Dental hygienist
- Denturist
- Orthodontic Technicians Association
- Dentition
