= Lingual plate =

A lingual plate is a type of mandibular major connector that is used in a removable partial denture in the field of dentistry. It is a type of major connector that covers the lingual gingival tissues. It also prevents forces from being directed facially. Once fabricated, adding teeth to this type of major connector is easier than the lingual bar.

== Indications ==
1. Depth of lingual vestibule is less than 7 mm
2. Additional loss of teeth is anticipated
3. Presence of a torus mandibularis
4. All posterior teeth are to be replaced bilaterally

== Contraindications ==
1. Higher food impaction
2. More tissue contact
3. Higher plaque accumulation

A lingual bar would be used in cases that are completely opposite to indications mentioned above.
