= Polyvinyl siloxane =

Impression material used in dentistry

Polyvinyl siloxane (PVS), also called poly-vinyl siloxane, vinyl polysiloxane (VPS), or vinylpolysiloxane, is an addition-reaction silicone elastomer (an addition silicone). It is a viscous liquid that cures (solidifies) quickly into a rubber-like solid, taking the shape of whatever surface it was lying against while curing. As with two-part epoxy, its package keeps its two component liquids in separate tubes until the moment they are mixed and applied, because once mixed, they cure (harden) rapidly. Polyvinyl siloxane is widely used in dentistry as an impression material. It is also used in other contexts where an impression similar to a dental impression is needed, such as in audiology (to take ear impressions for fitting custom hearing protection or hearing aids) or in industrial applications (such as to aid in the inspection of interior features of machined parts, for example, internal grooves inside bores). Polyvinyl siloxane was commercially introduced in the 1970s.

To create the material, the user simply mixes a colored putty (often blue or pink) with a white putty, and the chemical reaction begins. PVS with a wide variety of working and setting times is available commercially. Final set is noted when the product rebounds upon touching with a blunt or sharp instrument.

This reaction also gives off hydrogen gas and it is therefore advisable to wait up to an hour before pouring the ensuing cast.

In dentistry, this material is commonly referred to as having light or heavy body depending on specific usage.

== See also ==
- Dental impression
- Dentures
