= Neutral zone (dentistry) =

In dentistry, the neutral zone refers to that space in the oral cavity where the forces exerted by the musculature of the tongue are equal and balanced with the forces exerted by the buccinator muscle of the cheek laterally and the orbicularis oris muscle anteriorly.

In other words, it is the potential space between the lips and cheeks on one side and the tongue on the other; where the forces between the two are equal. Other synonyms include: zone of equilibrium, zone of minimal conflict, potential denture space and dead space. It is in this zone that the natural dentition lie, and this is where artificial teeth of complete dentures should be positioned. Complete dentures that are constructed in this way exhibit enhanced stability, retention and comfort.

The neutral zone is an important concept in prosthodontics, because prosthetic teeth generally must conform to the horizontal position determined by the neutral zone. Prostheses which set teeth outside this zone risk problems such as discomfort, cheek or tongue biting, and instability of the denture.

The neutral zone is also important in orthodontics. Moving teeth outside of this zone means that the muscular forces on the teeth will be out of balance in one direction, and tend to be more likely to relapse to their original position.

== Indications ==
The neutral zone technique is indicated in cases where there has been:

- Extensively resorbed mandibular ridge (minimal bone available to support a denture)
- Patients with neurological conditions
- Patients who have previously had partial glossectomies, mandibular resection and/or motor nerve damage to the tongue
- Where dental implants are not feasible

== Advantages and Disadvantages ==
Advantages of constructing a denture within the neutral zone include:

- Improved stability and retention of complete dentures (particularly lower complete dentures)
- Correct positioning of posterior artificial teeth allows for sufficient tongue space
- Reduced food trapping
- Improved aesthetics due to facial support

Disadvantages include:

- Increased clinical time
- Increased laboratory costs
