= Dental impression =

Imprint of mouth tissue

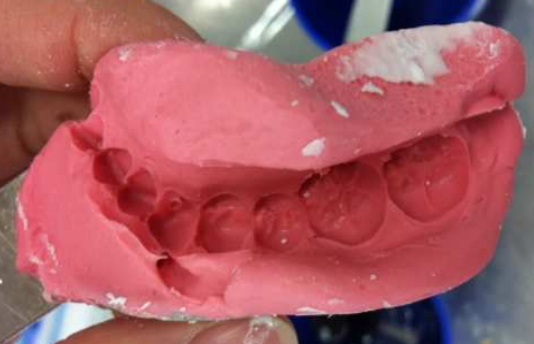
An impression body, made from alginate impression material.

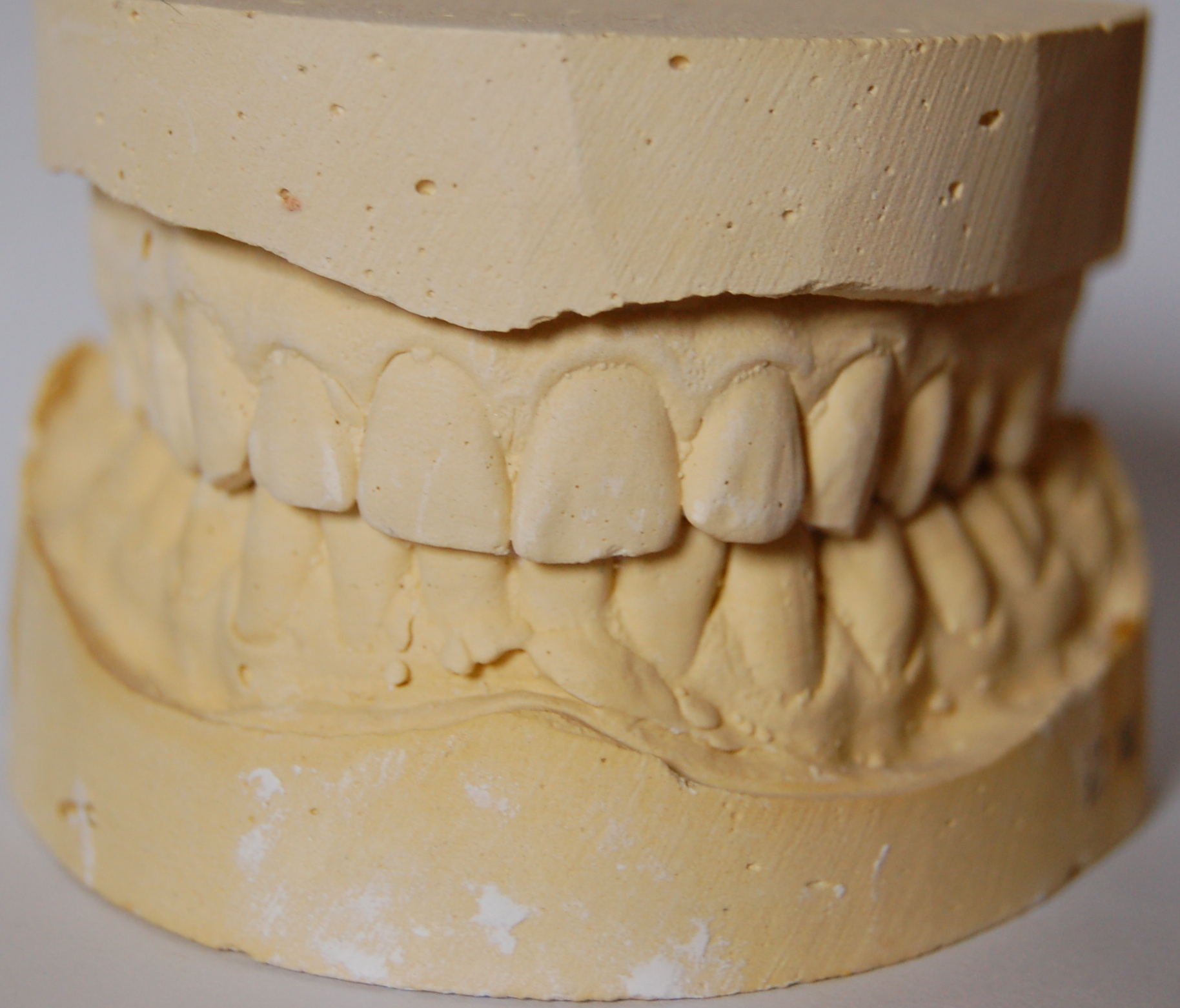
A custom dental model or plaster cast.

A dental impression is a negative imprint of hard and soft tissues in the mouth from which a positive reproduction, such as a cast or model, can be formed. It is made by placing an appropriate material in a dental impression tray which is designed to roughly fit over the dental arches. The impression material is liquid or semi-solid when first mixed and placed in the mouth. It then sets to become an elastic solid, which usually takes a few minutes depending upon the material. This leaves an imprint of a person's dentition and surrounding structures of the oral cavity.

Digital impressions using computerized scanning are now available.

== Uses ==
Impressions, and the study models, are used in several areas of dentistry including:

- diagnosis and treatment planning
- prosthodontics (such as making dentures)
- orthodontics
- restorative dentistry (e.g. to make impressions of teeth which have been prepared to receive indirect extracoronal restorations such as crowns, bridges, inlays and onlays)

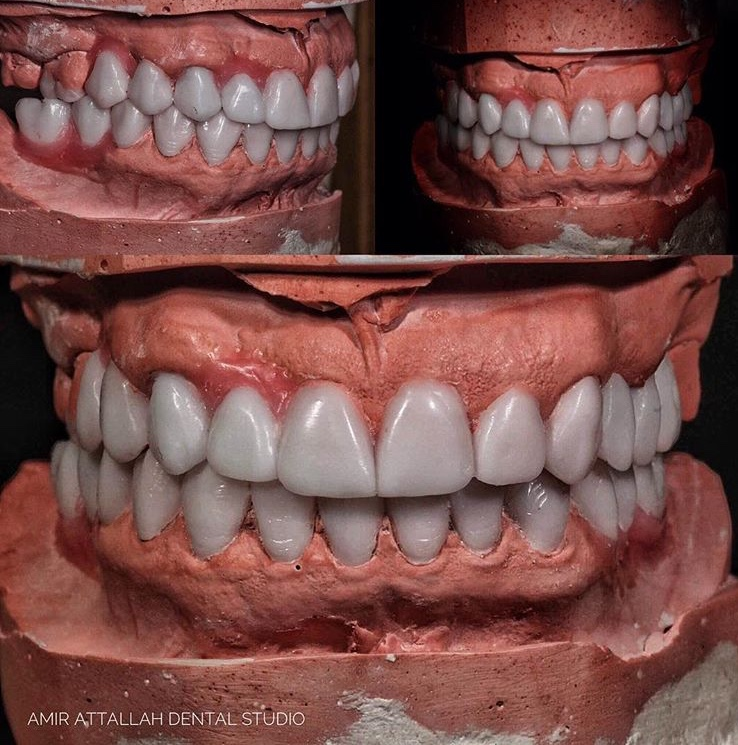
Wax mock up of crowns on a cast made from an impression

- maxillofacial prosthetics (prosthetic rehabilitation of intra-oral and extra-oral defects due to trauma, congenital defects, and surgical resection of tumors)
- oral and maxillofacial surgery for both intra-oral and or extra-oral aims (e.g. dental implants)

The required type of material for taking an impression and the area that it covers will depend on the clinical indication. Common materials used for dental impressions are:

- non rigid materials:
  - reversible hydrocolloids: agar
  - irreversible hydrocolloids: sodium alginate
  - elastomeric materials:
    - silicones (polyvinyl siloxane): condensation-cured silicones, addition silicones, vinyl polyether silicones (VPES)
    - polyethers
    - polysulphides
- rigid materials:
  - plaster of Paris
  - impression compound
  - zinc oxide and eugenol-based impression paste

== Techniques for taking impression ==
Impressions can also be described as mucostatic or mucocompressive, being defined both by the impression material used and the type of impression tray used (i.e. spaced or closely adapted). Mucostatic means that the impression is taken with the mucosa in its normal resting position. These impressions will generally lead to a denture which has a good fit during rest, but during chewing, the denture will tend to pivot around incompressible areas (e.g. torus palatinus) and dig into compressible areas. Mucocompressive means that the impression is taken when the mucosa is subject to compression. These impressions will generally lead to a denture that is most stable during function but not at rest. Dentures are at rest most of the time, so it could be argued that mucostatic impressions make better dentures, however in reality it is likely that tissue adaption to the presence of either a denture made with a mucostatic or a mucocompressive technique make little difference between the two in the long term. Another type of impression technique is selective pressure technique in which stress bearing areas are compressed and stress relief areas are relieved such that both the advantages of muco static and muco compressive techniques are achieved.

  - User Guide of Dental Impression material: https://www.youtube.com/watch?v=-keGMbCHC2A

== Special techniques ==
- "Wash impression" – this is a very thin layer of low viscosity impression material which is used to record fine details. Usually it is the second stage, where the runny impression material is used after an initial impression taken with a more viscous material.
- Two phase one stage: the putty and low body weight impression materials are inserted to the mouth at once .
- Two phase two stage: first the putty is set in the mouth then low body weight material is added on the top of ready impression and inserted to the mouth to get the final accurate impression
- Functional impression (also known as secondary impression)
- Neutral zone impression
- Window technique
- Altered cast technique
- Applegate technique

=== Impression for provision of fixed prosthesis ===
The preparation border must be accurately captured by the light bodied impression material when taking impressions for crown and bridge work. As a result, the gingival tissues must be pushed away from the preparation margin in order for the impression material to be accessible. Inserting a retraction cord into the gingival crevice is one method of retracting gingival tissues away from the tooth.

== Impression materials ==
Impression materials can be considered as follows:

=== Rigid ===
==== Plaster of Paris (impression plaster) ====
Plaster of Paris is traditionally used as a casting material once the impression has been taken, however its use as an impression material is occasionally useful in edentate patients. The tissues are not displaced during impression taking, hence the material is termed mucostatic. Mainly composed of β-calcium sulphate hemihydrate, impression plaster has a similar composition and setting reaction to the casting material with an increase in certain components to control the initial expansion that is observed with Plaster of Paris. Additionally, more water is added to the powder than with the casting material to aid in good flow during impression taking. As the impression material is very similar to the casting material to be used, it requires the incorporation of a separating medium (e.g. sodium alginate) to aid in separating the cast from the impression. If a special tray is to be used, impression plaster requires 1–1.5mm spacing for adequate thickness.

Advantages:

- Hydrophilic
- Good detail reproduction
- Good dimensional stability (contraction on setting)
- Good patient tolerance
- 2–3 minutes working time

Disadvantages:

- Brittle
- No recovery from deformation. Therefore, if an undercut is present the material will have to be broken off the impression and then glued back together prior to casting
- Excess salivation by the patient could have adverse effect on detail reproduction

==== Impression compound ====
Impression compound has been used for many years as an impression material for removable prostheses. Although its use has recently declined with the advent of better materials. Due to its poor flow characteristics, it is unable to reproduce fine detail and so its use is somewhat limited to the following scenarios:

- Primary impressions of complete dentures
- Border moulding of trays
- Extension of trays
- Achieving mucocompression in the post-dam area when working impressions are taken for complete dentures

Impression compound is a thermoplastic material; it is presented as a sheet of material, which is warmed in hot water (> 55–60 °C) for one minute, and loaded on a tray prior to impression taking. Once in the mouth, the material will harden and record the detail of the soft tissues. The impression can further be hardened by placing it in cold water after use. Impressions with compound should be poured within an hour as the material exhibits poor dimensional stability. There are two main presentations of impression compound: red compound and greenstick. The latter is mainly used for border moulding and recording the post-dam area.

==== Vinyl polysiloxane impression material (impression material) ====
vinyl polysiloxane dental impression materials used for making accurate dental impressions with excellent reproducibility. It is available in Putty and light body consistencies to aid dentists make perfect impressions for fabrication of crowns, bridges, inlays, onlays and veneers. Example Flexceed

Advantages:

- Better reproduction detail with two viscosities (Putty & Light Body)
- Exhibits pseudo-plastic properties for precision which is not found in alginates
- Superior tear strength than any other VPS material
- Better dimensional stability – multiple models can be poured up to two weeks
- Good hydrophilicity
- Compatible with gypsum products
- Superior wetting characteristics ensuring gypsum working cast is hard with smooth surface
- Can be subjected to cold sterilization without compromising the details and dimensional stability of the impression

==== Zinc-oxide eugenol plaster (impression paste) ====
Impression paste is traditionally used to take the working (secondary) impressions for a complete denture. When used with a special tray it requires 1 mm of spacing to allow for enough thickness of the material; this is also termed a close fitting special tray. It is available as a two-paste system:

- Base paste: zinc oxide
- Catalyst paste: eugenol

The two pastes should be used in equal amounts and blended together with a stainless steel spatula (Clarident spatula) on a paper pad. Zinc-oxide Eugenol plaster will produce a mucostatic impression.

Advantages:

- Thermoplastic – can be heated to aid removal from the casting material
- Good detail reproduction
- Good dimensional stability (0.15% shrinkage on setting)

Disadvantages:

- Rigid – presence of undercuts can distort the final material or cause the section engaged to separate from resultant impression

== Impression waxes ==
=== Non rigid ===
==== Hydrocolloid ====
===== Agar =====
Agar is a material which provides high accuracy. Therefore, it is used in fixed prosthodontics (crowns, bridges) or when a dental model has to be duplicated by a dental technician. Agar is a true hydrophilic material, hence the teeth do not need to be dried before placing it into the mouth. It is a reversible hydrocolloid which means that its physical state can be changed by altering its temperature which allows to reuse the material multiple times. The material comes in form of tubes or cartridges. A special hardware is required in the process of taking agar impressions, namely a water bath and rim lock trays with coiled edges allowing passage of cold water for cooling the material to set while in the mouth. The bath consists of three containers filled with water at different temperatures: the first is set at 100 °C to liquefy the agar, the second is used to lower down the temperature of the material for safe intra-oral use (usually set at 43–46 °C) and the third one is used for storage and is set at 63–66 °C. The storage container can maintain agar tubes and cartridges at temperature 63–66 °C for several days for convenient immediate use. The tray is connected to a hose, material is loaded onto the tray and placed in the mouth over the preparation – an adequate thickness of the material is required, otherwise distortion may occur upon removal from the mouth. The other end of the hose is connected to a cold water source. The hydrocolloid is then cooled down through the tray wall which results in setting of the material. The models should be poured as soon as possible to avoid changes in dimensional stability.

Modern dentistry offers other materials (e.g. elastomerics) which provide high accuracy impressions and are easier to use hence agar is used less frequently.

Advantages:

- high accuracy
- hydrophilic
- reusable

Disadvantages:

- complex procedural steps
- significant start-up cost of the hardware

===== Alginate =====
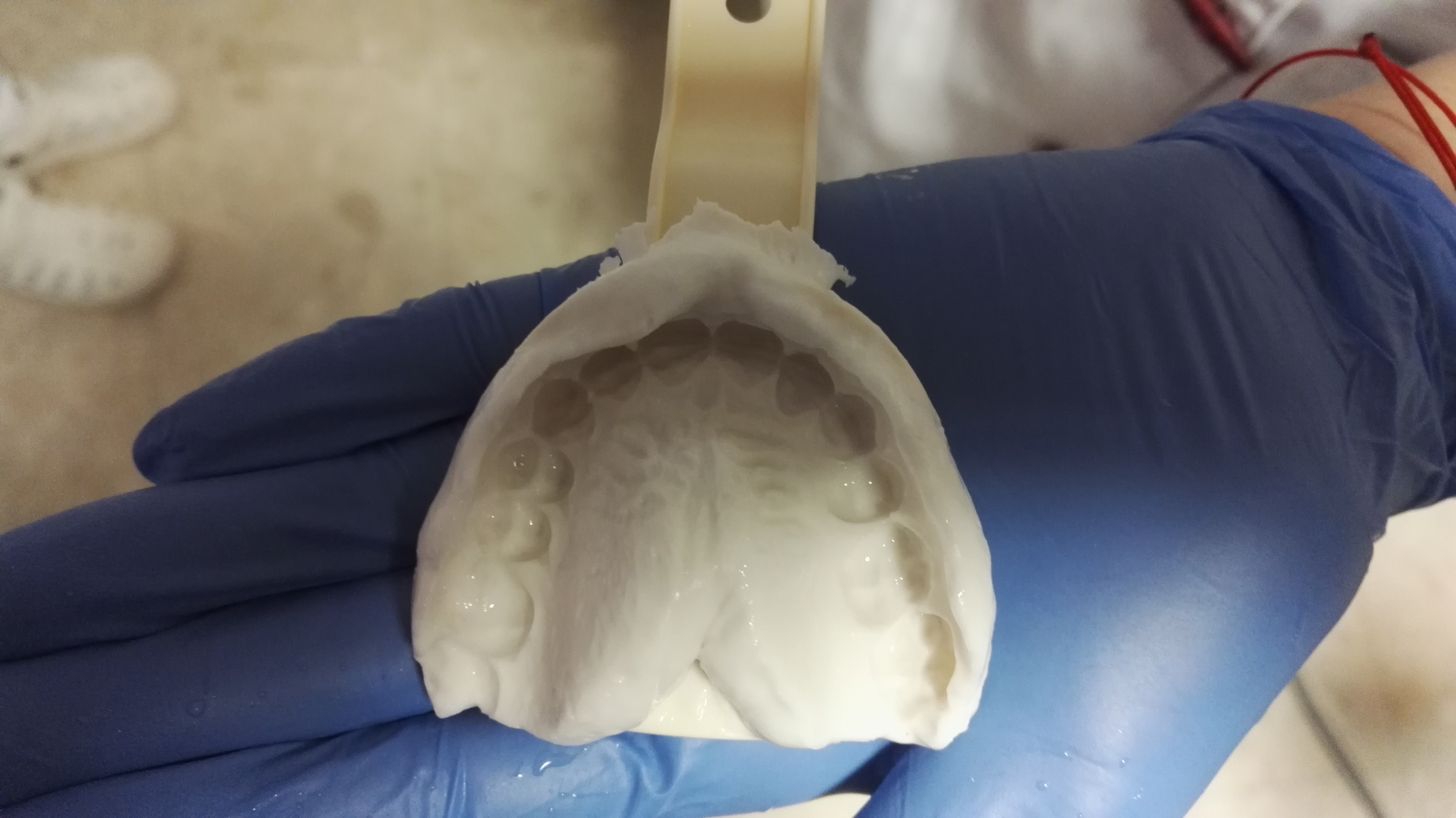
Dental impression of upper teeth recorded by Alginate

Alginate, on the other hand, is an irreversible hydrocolloid. It exists in two phases: either as a viscous liquid, or a solid gel, the transition generated by a chemical reaction. The impression material is created through adding water to the powdered alginate which contains a mixture of sodium and potassium salts of alginic acid. The overall setting double composition reaction is as follows:

Potassium (sodium) alginate + calcium sulphate dihydrate + water → calcium alginate + potassium (sodium) sulphate

Sodium phosphate is added as a retarder which preferentially reacts with calcium ions to delay the set of the material.

Alginate has a mixing time of 45–60 secs, a working time of 45 secs (fast set) and 75 secs (regular set). The setting time can be between 1 – 4.5 mins which can be varied by the temperature of water used: the cooler the water, the slower the set and vice versa. You want to ensure that the material is fully set before removal from the mouth.

The water content that the completed impression is exposed to must be controlled. Improper storage can either result in syneresis (the material contracts upon standing and exudes liquid) or imbibition (water uptake which is uncontrolled in extent and direction). Therefore, the impression must be stored correctly, which involves wrapping the set material in a damp tissue and storing it in a sealed polythene bag until the impression can be cast. Alginate is used in dental circumstances when less accuracy is required. For example, this includes the creation of study casts to plan dental cases and design prosthesis, and also to create the primary and working impressions for denture construction.

Several faults can be encountered when using an alginate impression material, but these can generally be avoided through adequate mixing, correct spatulation, correct storage of the set material, and timely pouring of the impression.

Due to the increased accuracy of elastomers, they are recommended for taking secondary impressions over alginate. Patients both preferred the overall experience of having an impression taken with an elastomer than with alginate, and also favoured the resultant dentures produced.

Advantages:

- Easy flow
- Cheap
- Reproduction of adequate detail
- Fast setting time
- Minimal tissue displacement in the mouth

Disadvantages:

- It has poor dimensional stability
- Poor tear strength
- If it is unsupported, it distorts
- Easy to include air during mixing
- A minimum thickness of 3 mm is required which is hard to achieve in thin areas in between the teeth

=== Non-aqueous elastomeric impression materials ===
As stated above, there are times clinically where the accuracy of an alginate impression is not acceptable, particularly for the construction of fixed prosthodontics. Agar may be used but as discussed has a number of technical difficulties in its use. As such elastomers were developed to capture the fine detail and accuracy required.

==== Polysulphides ====
Polysulphides have become increasingly unpopular due to their unpleasant taste/smell. The material is presented as a paste to paste system mixed by a dental nurse prior to use. The material sets by a condensation polymerisation reaction. Initially the polymer chains increase in length causing a slight increase in temperature, of 3–4 °C. This is then followed by cross linking of the polymer chains and finally the release of water as a by product. This later reaction slightly contracts the material making it stiffer and more resistant to permanent deformation. When poured and cast this slight contraction means the resulting model is slightly larger and as such creates space for the luting cement.

Advantages:

- Good tear resistance
- Dimensionally stable – some shrinkage on set with release of by-product
- Good Accuracy
- Most flexible elastomer

Disadvantages:

- Reduced patient satisfaction – distinct unpleasant taste and smell
- Long setting time
- Requires excellent moisture control
- Difficult to mix

==== Polyethers ====
Polyethers are the most hydrophilic impression material of the hydrophobic elastomers. This property makes it a commonly used material in general practice as it more likely to capture preparation margins when moisture control is not perfect.

Presented as a paste to paste system the material is often used with a monophase impression technique, meaning both the material syringed round the preparation and the bulk within the tray are the same material. Note when mixing polyether the base to accelerator ratio is not 1:1 like with most elastomers, but 1:4.

Advantages:

- Most hydrophilic elastomeric impression material
- Dimensionally stable – minimal shrinkage on set with release of by-product
- Good accuracy
- Monophase impression
- Good tear resistance

Disadvantages:

- Can be too stiff – deep undercuts and space under a bridge pontic should be blocked out with soft (modelling) wax to prevent inadvertently removing bridge with impression

Indications:

- Indirect cast restorations, especially in cases where moisture control cannot be guaranteed
- Locating and the pick up of implant analogues in preparation for placement of superstructure
- Functional impression taking in removable prosthodontics

==== Silicones ====
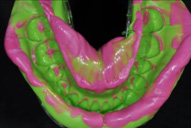
Impression taken with silicone

There are two types of silicone resin impression material, addition and condensation (reflecting each of their setting reactions). Silicones are inherently hydrophobic and as such require excellent moisture control for optimal use.

===== Addition silicone =====
Addition silicones have become the most used impression material in advanced restorative dentistry. There are many forms available, based on their differing amounts of filler content. This dictates the flow properties of each type with more filler resulting in a thicker, less flowable material. The most common forms are: extra light-bodied (low filler content), light-bodied, universal or medium-bodied, heavy-bodied and putty (high filler content). However each type follows the same addition polymerisation reaction and is presented as a paste to paste system. The reaction does not produce any by-product making it dimensionally stable and very accurate.

Advantages:

- Good detail reproduction
- Excellent dimensional stability – no shrinkage on set
- High patient acceptance
- More than one model can be poured from one cast

Disadvantages:

- Hydrophobic – requires excellent moisture control
- Too accurate – impression may not be compensated for during investment and casting, resulting in too small a die being produced and subsequently too small a restoration.
- Poor tear resistance
- Expensive

Indications:

- Indirect cast restorations
- Multiple models required
- Impressions for removable prosthodontics
- Bite registration material

Contraindications

- Inadequate moisture control

===== Condensation silicone =====
Condensation silicones are commonly used as a putty, paste or light bodied material. The systems are usually presented as a paste or putty and a liquid/paste catalyst; meaning accurate proportioning is difficult to achieve resulting in varied outcomes. For example, the setting reaction of putty is started by kneading a low viscosity paste accelerator into a bulk of silicone with high filler content.

As stated the material sets by a condensation reaction forming a three-dimensional silicone matrix whilst releasing ethyl alcohol as a by-product. This in turn results in a minimally exothermic set with marked shrinkage on setting (shrinkage being relative to filler content, where high filler content has reduced shrinkage).

Advantages:

- Accurate
- High patient acceptance

Disadvantages:

- Hydrophobic – requires excellent moisture control
- Unreliable dimensional stability – difficult to accurately proportion components leading to variable results
- Marked shrinkage on setting with release of by-product

Indications:

- Indirect cast restorations
- Matrices for indirect/direct restoration
- Working impressions for metal based removable prosthodontics and relines
- Lab putty

== Impression trays ==
An impression tray is a container which holds the impression material as it sets, and supports the set impression until after casting. Impression trays can be separated into two main categories- stock trays and special trays.

=== Stock trays ===
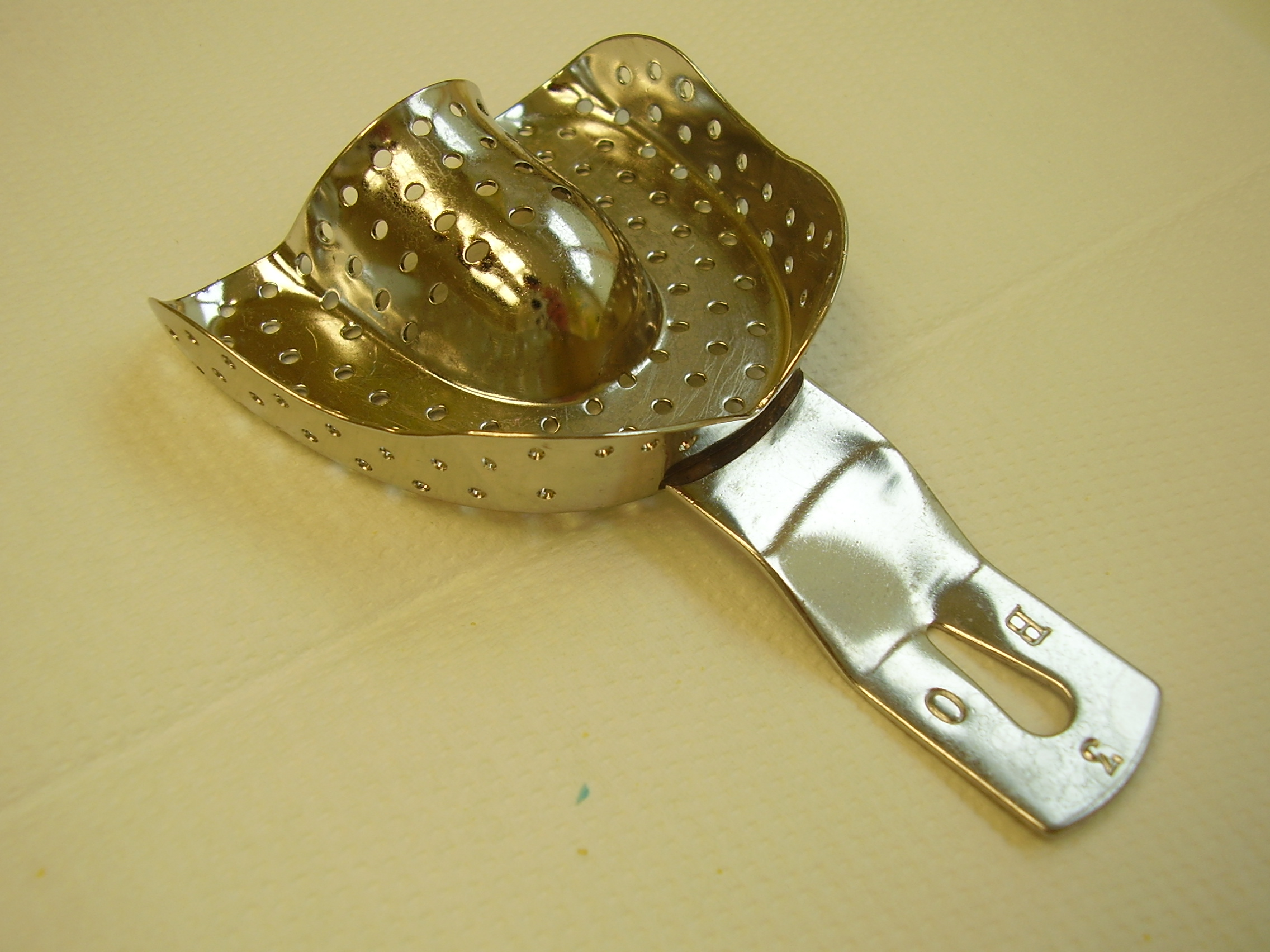
Metal stock tray for upper jaw

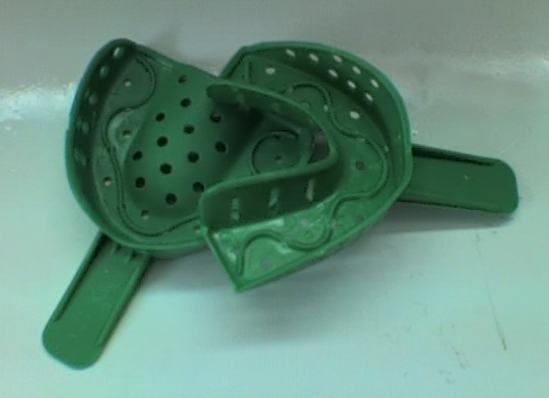
Plastic stock trays of both jaws

Stock trays are used to take primary impressions and come in a range of sizes and shapes, and can be plastic or metal. Stock trays can be rounded (designed to fit the mouths of people with no remaining teeth) or squared (designed to fit people with some remaining teeth). They can be full arch, covering all the teeth in either the upper or lower jaw in one impression, or a partial coverage tray, designed to fit over about three teeth (used when making crowns). The stock tray with the closest size and shape to the patient's own arch dimensions is selected for impressions.

Stock trays must meet various requirements in order to obtain a satisfactory impression. A good stock tray will:

- Be rigid enough to endure the force of the dental impression material being positioned in the mouth. Flexure of the tray under force would cause the tray to be distorted, so when the impression tray is removed the impression would be narrower and distorted. This is particularly important for plastic stock trays.
- Be of appropriate dimensions to obtain the most accurate impression of the region being reproduced possible. Inadequate extension of an impression tray where the impression material is not supported would likely cause distortions in the impression of the area.
- Be loose enough around the dental arch to not touch the soft tissues of the mouth.
- Have a sturdy handle to allow the tray to be easily removed from the mouth.
- Be easily disinfected, unless for single use. Disposable trays are often preferred due to increasing legislation about infection control in medicine and dentistry.

Stock trays can be dentate or edentulous, and perforated (used with alginate) or non-perforated (allows the impression material to run through the holes and increase the bond of the impression material to the tray when set).

==== Plastic stock trays ====
Plastic stock trays are generally injection moulded from a high-impact styrene such as polystyrene. The Triple Tray is a type of plastic tray used for taking impressions for a crown using the double arch or dual bite impression technique. It is used for taking impressions of the tooth preparation and the opposing teeth, by the use of a special impression material, usually elastomer. The accuracy of the results is however subject to the ability of the patient to close their teeth when the tray is present in the mouth. It cannot produce results of the complete arch, therefore its usefulness is limited.

==== Metal stock trays ====
Metal stock trays are often preferred over plastic stock trays, due to the lack of rigidity in plastic stock trays. Although expensive to purchase, they have the benefit of being reusable, so can be more cost-efficient in the long-term.

=== Custom trays ===
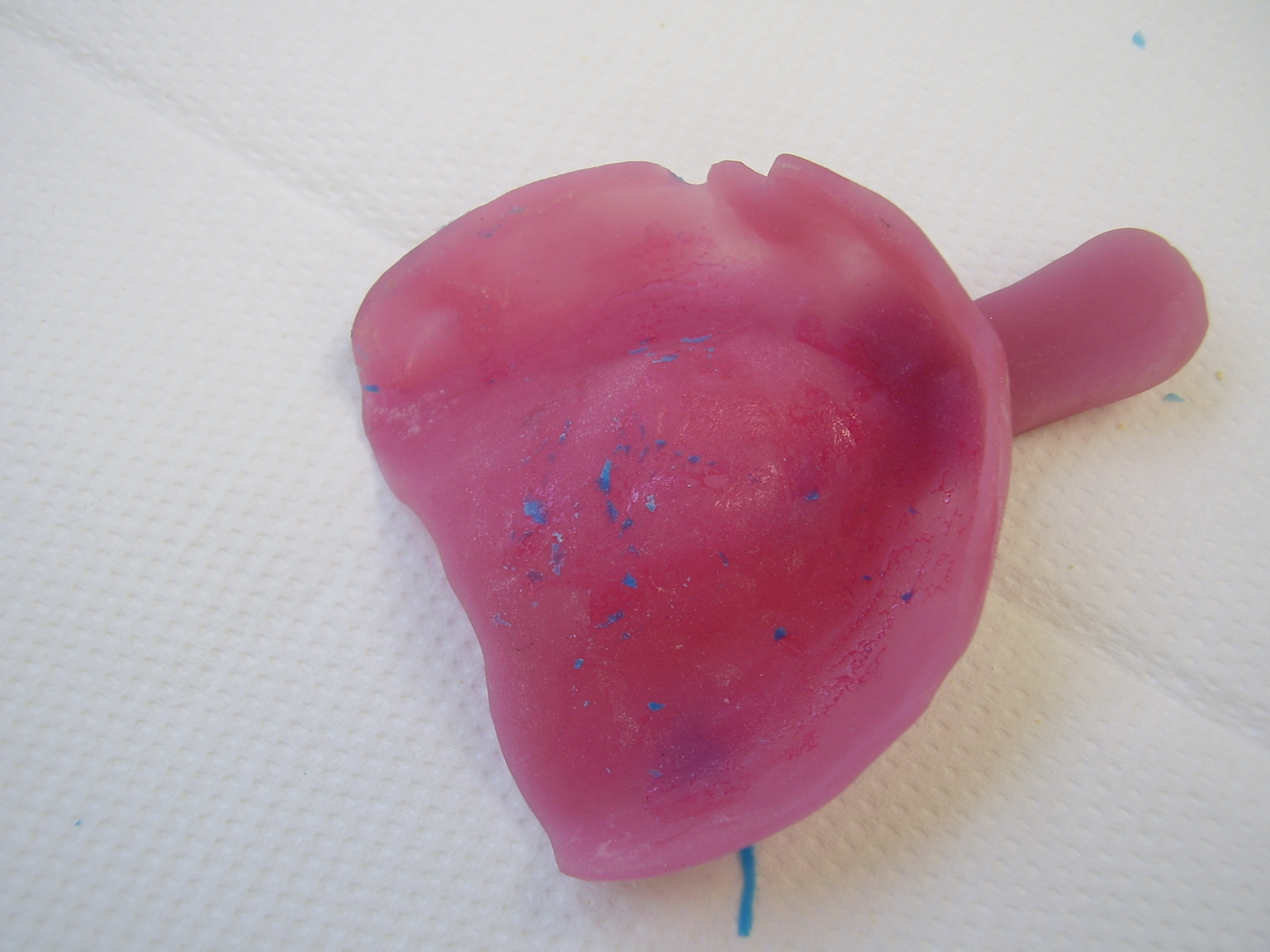
Acrylic custom tray

A special tray is an impression tray custom made for an individual patient by a denturist (dental technician), usually made from acrylic, such as polymethyl methacrylate, or shellac. A stock tray is used to make a preliminary impression, from which a model can be cast. This is then used for wax to make the tray to be laid down. The thickness corresponds to specific spacing, and can be classed as spaced, where about 3mm of space is left between the tray and the mucosa for the impression material to occupy, or closely adapted, where less space is left for the impression material. This is determined by the impression material to be used.

Specific features can be given to the special tray to improve the accuracy of the impression such as a window which can help to record displaceable tissues such as flabby ridges when used with a less viscous impression material. Special trays can be given perforations if required by drilling holes in tray.

Customised trays have been less frequently used since the advent of putties. This is due to the putty providing good support for light bodied material, and showing very little dimensional change which provides a fine detailed dental impression. There is now a large increase in the variety of stock trays available.

=== Tray adhesives ===
Tray adhesives are used to ensure the retention of the impression material in the impression tray, with or without the presence of perforations, and are based on contact adhesive technology. Maximum retention can be achieved with the presence of both a tray adhesive and perforations in the impression tray. The adhesive is applied to the internal surface of the tray, as well as over the margins to ensure the binding of the outer edge of the impression material to the tray. A suitable amount of adhesive (usually two thin coats) should be applied to the tray to prevent pooling of the adhesive which can weaken the bond between the tray and impression material. The adhesive should be completely dried prior to impression-taking. Tray adhesives usually come in a screw-top bottle with a brush attached to the lid that can be used for applying the adhesive. Over time, the adhesive can accumulate around the cap, causing the evaporation of the solvent, and consequently the thickening of the adhesive. This can reduce the efficacy of the adhesive to bind to the tray.

==== Types ====
Various tray adhesives are available, corresponding to the impression material used.

Impression materials and corresponding adhesives
Impression material	Adhesive used
Polyether	Ethyl acetate dissolved in propanol or acetone
Polysulphide	Styrene acrylonite or butyl rubber dissolved in a ketone or in chloroform
Alginate	10–12% toluene dissolved in 45–50% isopropanol
Condensation silicone	Ethyl silicate (bonds to tray) and poly dimethyl silicone (reacts with impression material)
Addition silicone	Ethyl silicate (bonds to tray) and poly dimethyl silicone (reacts with impression material), often with the addition of naphtha and ethyl acetate

== Digital impressions ==
Digital impressions using extra-oral or intra-oral scanner systems are being adopted in dentistry. A model can be produced from the digital scan by milling or stereolithography.
