= Removable partial denture =

Prosthesis (dentistry)

- MeSH: D003832

A removable partial denture (RPD) is a denture for a partially edentulous patient who desires to have replacement teeth for functional or aesthetic reasons and who cannot have a bridge (a fixed partial denture) for any reason, such as a lack of required teeth to serve as support for a bridge (i.e. distal abutments) or financial limitations.

This type of prosthesis is referred to as a removable partial denture because patients can remove and reinsert it when required without professional help. Conversely, a "fixed" prosthesis can and should be removed only by a dental professional.

The aim of an RPD is to restore masticatory function, speech, appearance and other anatomical features.

== Usage ==
RPD may be used when there is a lack of required teeth to serve as support for a bridge (i.e. distal abutments) or financial limitations. A single-tooth RPD known as a "flipper tooth" may be used temporarily after a tooth is extracted, during the several months it takes to complete the placement of a dental implant and crown.

Advantages of using RPD include:

- Reduced encroachment on existing teeth
- Replacement of a greater number of missing teeth
- Easily removed for cleaning and hygiene maintenance
- Fairly simple to fix/replace the prosthesis if damaged
- Modifications can be made to the prosthesis in some cases following additional tooth loss

Disadvantages of using RPD include:

- Limited stability whilst in function
- Significant coverage even in cases where few teeth require replacement in order to maximise retention
- Visible components depending on teeth needing replacement
- Potential risk to the health of remaining teeth due to plaque accumulation or trauma

== Classification ==
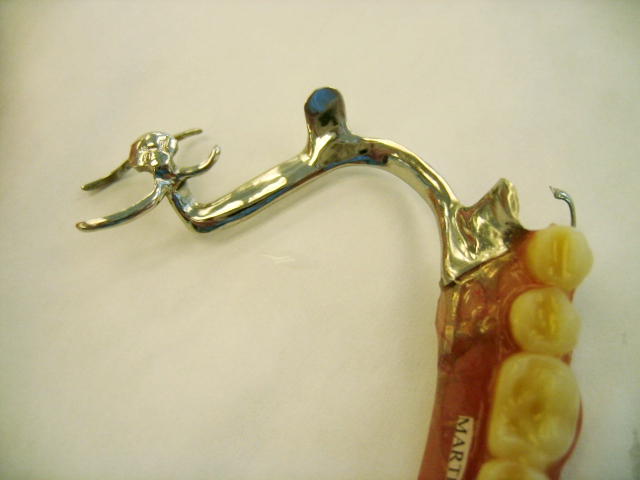
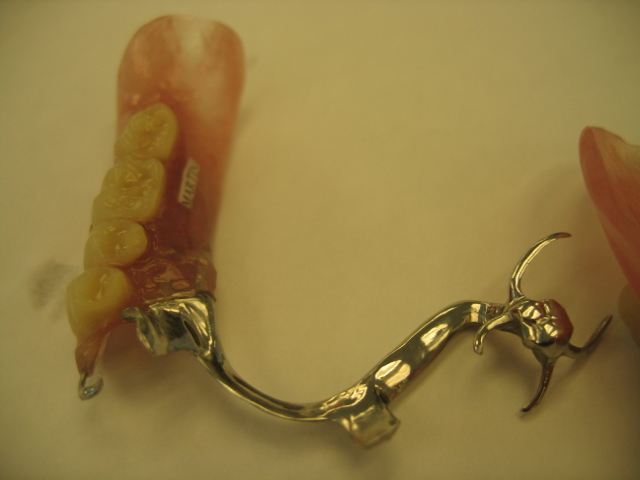
The images above show the same Removable Partial Denture (RPD) for a patient whose mandible is partially edentulous. Their mouth is Kennedy classification II RPD as evidenced by the unilateral row of teeth on the right side of the denture. An embrasure clasp is viewable on the device's left half, as well as two cingulum rests for the two canines on the mandible. The major connector is either a lingual bar or a sublingual bar.

The patient's oral condition is categorized based on the remaining dentition in a classification first proposed by Dr. Edward Kennedy in 1925. His classification consisted of four general outlines for partially edentulous arches that can present within a patient, which then could be treated with an RPD. When there is an edentulous space that is outside of the four classifications, it is termed a modification space. The use of this classification allows for easier communication between dental professionals, allows for easily visualization of the arch, and distinguishes a tooth-borne or tissue-supported RPD.

- Class I (bilateral free ended partially edentulous)
- Class II (unilateral free ended partially edentulous)
- Class III (unilateral bounded partially edentulous)
- Class IV (bilateral bounded anterior partially edentulous)

Kennedy Class I RPDs are fabricated for people who are missing some or all of their posterior teeth on both sides (left and right) in a single arch (either mandibular or maxillary), and there are no teeth posterior to the edentulous area. In other words, Class I RPDs clasp onto teeth that are more towards the front of the mouth, while replacing the missing posterior teeth on both sides with false denture teeth. The denture teeth are composed of either plastic or porcelain.

Class II RPDs are fabricated for people who are missing some or all of their posterior teeth on one side (left or right) in a single arch, and there are no teeth behind the edentulous area. Thus, Class II RPDs clasp onto teeth that are more towards the front of the mouth, as well as on teeth that are more towards the back of the mouth of the side on which teeth are not missing, while replacing the missing more-back-of-the-mouth teeth on one side with false denture teeth.

Class III RPDs are fabricated for people who are missing some teeth in such a way that the edentulous area has teeth remaining both posterior and anterior to it. Unlike Class I and Class II RPDs which are both tooth-and-tissue-borne (meaning they both clasp onto teeth, as well as rest on the posterior edentulous area for support), Class III RPDs are strictly tooth-borne, which means they only clasp onto teeth and do not need to rest on the tissue for added support. This makes Class III RPDs exceedingly more secure as per the three rules of removable prostheses that will be mentioned later, namely: support, stability and retention. (See the article on dentures for a more thorough review of these three fundamentals of removable prosthodontics.)

However, if the edentulous area described in the previous paragraph crosses the anterior midline (that is, at least both central incisors are missing), the RPD is classified as a Class IV RPD. By definition, a Kennedy Class IV RPD design will possess only one edentulous area.

Class I, II and III RPDs that have multiple edentulous areas in which replacement teeth are being placed are further classified with modification states that were defined by Oliver C. Applegate. Kennedy classification is governed by the most posterior edentulous area that is being restored. Thus if, for example, a maxillary arch is missing teeth #1, 3, 7-10 and 16, the RPD would be Kennedy Class III mod 1. It would not be Class I, because missing third molars are generally not restored in an RPD (although if they were, the classification would indeed be Class I), and it would not be Class IV, because modification spaces are not allowed for Kennedy Class IV.

The results of a study conducted in Saudi Arabia, showed that the occurrence of Kennedy Class III partial edentulism was 67.2% in the maxillary arch and 64.1% in the mandibular arch. Followed by Class II in both maxillary and mandibular arch with an average of 16.3% in maxillary arch and 14.8% in the mandibular arch. Based on these results, class III has the highest prevalence in younger group of patient (31– 40 years). Class I and class II have the highest incidence among older group of patients (41–50 years).

== Design ==
Prior to designing partial dentures a complete examination is undertaken to assess the condition of remaining teeth. This may involve radiographs, sensibility testing or other assessments. From this examination and assessment of occlusion (occlusal plane, drifting, tilting of teeth and surveyed articulated casts) the designing of partial dentures can begin. Information from previous dentures can be very useful in deciding which features to keep the same and which features of the design to change – in the hope of making an improvement.

=== Stages of partial denture design ===
A systematic design process should be followed:

- The teeth to be replaced must be decided.
- The soft tissue to be replaced (flange) is then drawn.
- The major connector is selected from a list of options (the options available will depend on the above assessment).
- Retentive features of the denture must be decided – these may include clasps, guide planes and indirect retention (often important in dentures involving Kennedy Class 1 and Class 2 saddles).
- Supportive features are then decided – these prevent the denture sinking into the soft tissue; often the natural teeth can take some of the loading (rest seats and connector coverage).

However, this is not always possible. Support may thus be tooth-borne, mucosal borne or a combination of tooth and mucosal borne.

- The denture should where possible have features that withstand horizontal movement (bracing) and the clasps should have appropriate reciprocation.
- The denture base material (usually acrylic or cobalt-chromium) and materials of the various components must be selected.
- The hygiene of the prosthesis must be appropriate trying where possible to minimise the soft tissues coverage.

The design should be reviewed and simplified removing unnecessary components.

Once the partial denture has been designed, the shade and mould of the replacement teeth can be selected. Within the design process (and prior to the master impression stage of denture construction), modifications may be suggested to teeth. This may be undertaken to create occlusal space for rest seats or to create undercuts for the placement of clasps (such as addition of composite resin) or to create guide planes for easier insertion and removal of the denture.

== Components ==
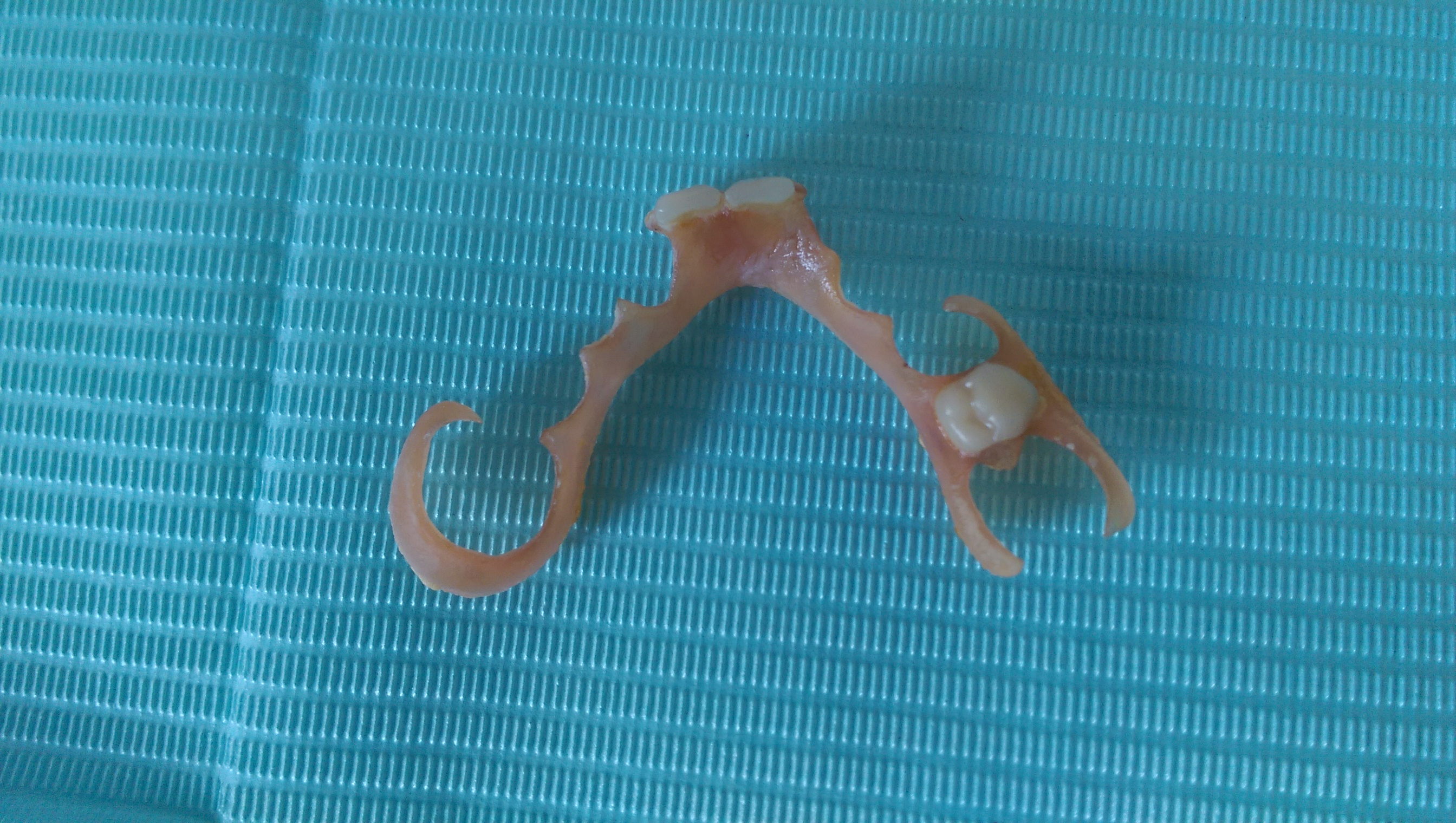
Removable partial denture made from flexible nylon resin

Rather than lying entirely on the edentulous ridge like complete dentures, removable partial dentures possess clasps of cobalt-chrome or titanium metal or plastic that "clip" onto the remaining teeth, making the RPD more stable and retentive.

The parts of an RPD can be listed as follows (and are exemplified by the picture above):

- Major connector (The thick metal "U" in the RPD image above is a lingual bar, a type of major connector)
  - Anterior-posterior palatal strap
  - Single palatal strap
  - U-shaped palatal connector (Horseshoe)
  - Lingual bar
  - Lingual plate
- Minor connector (See the small struts protruding from the lingual bar at roughly 90 degree angles.)
- Direct retainer (Examples are in the upper left of upper photo and lower right of lower photo; the clasp arms act to hug the teeth and keep the RPD in place. The metal clasp and rest immediately adjacent to the denture teeth is also a direct retainer.)
- Indirect retainer (An example is the little metal piece coming off the "U" at a 90 degree angle near the top of the upper photo, which is a cingulum rest on a canine.)
  - Physical retainer (This is a mesh of metal that allows the pink base material to connect to the metal framework of the RPD. Some consider physical retainers their own component (making a total of seven), while others consider them within the indirect retainer category (thus making a total of six components.)
- Base (the pink material, mimicking gingiva)
- Teeth (plastic or porcelain formed in the shape of teeth)

=== Major connectors for upper teeth ===
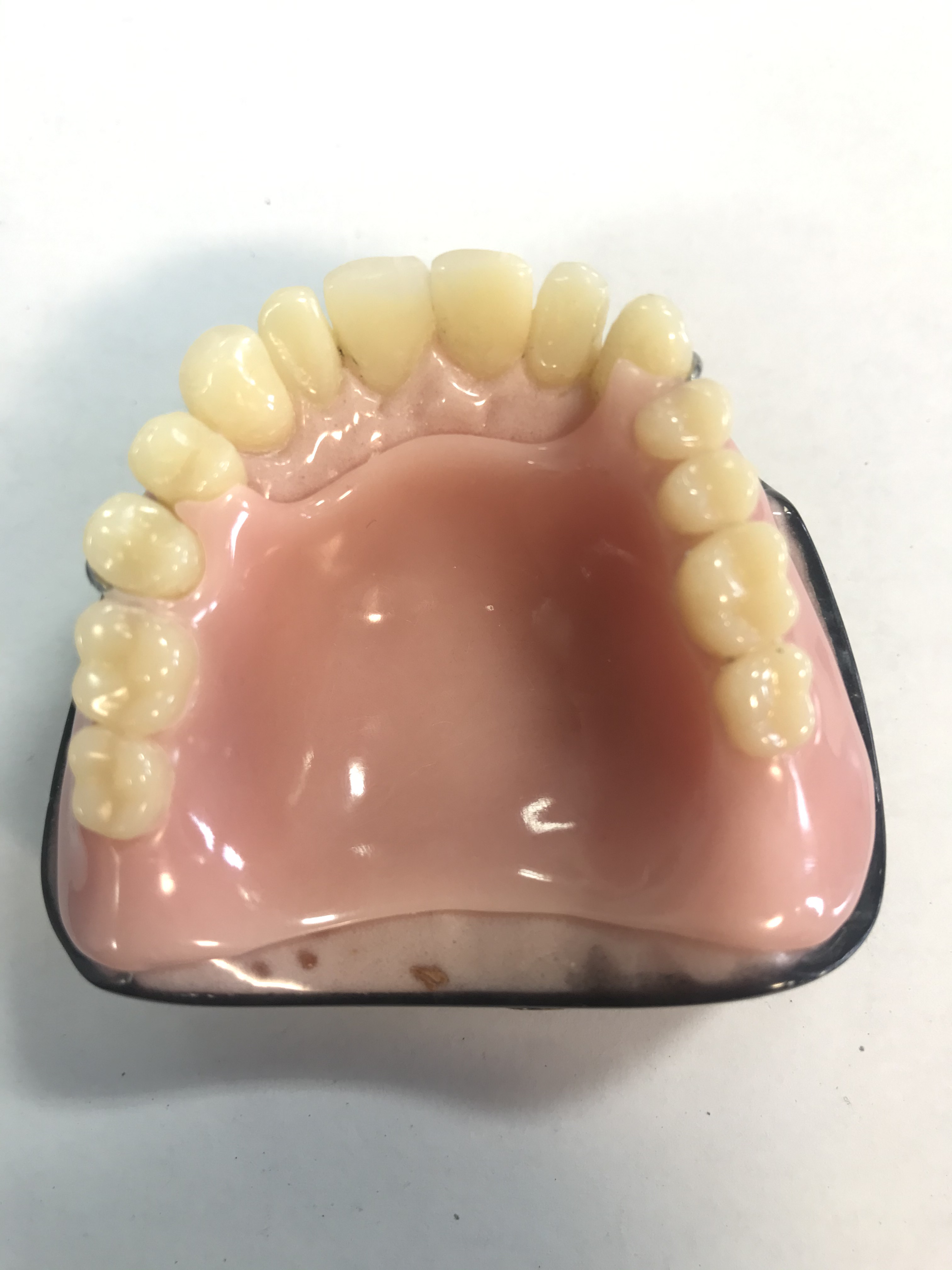
Acrylic denture plate

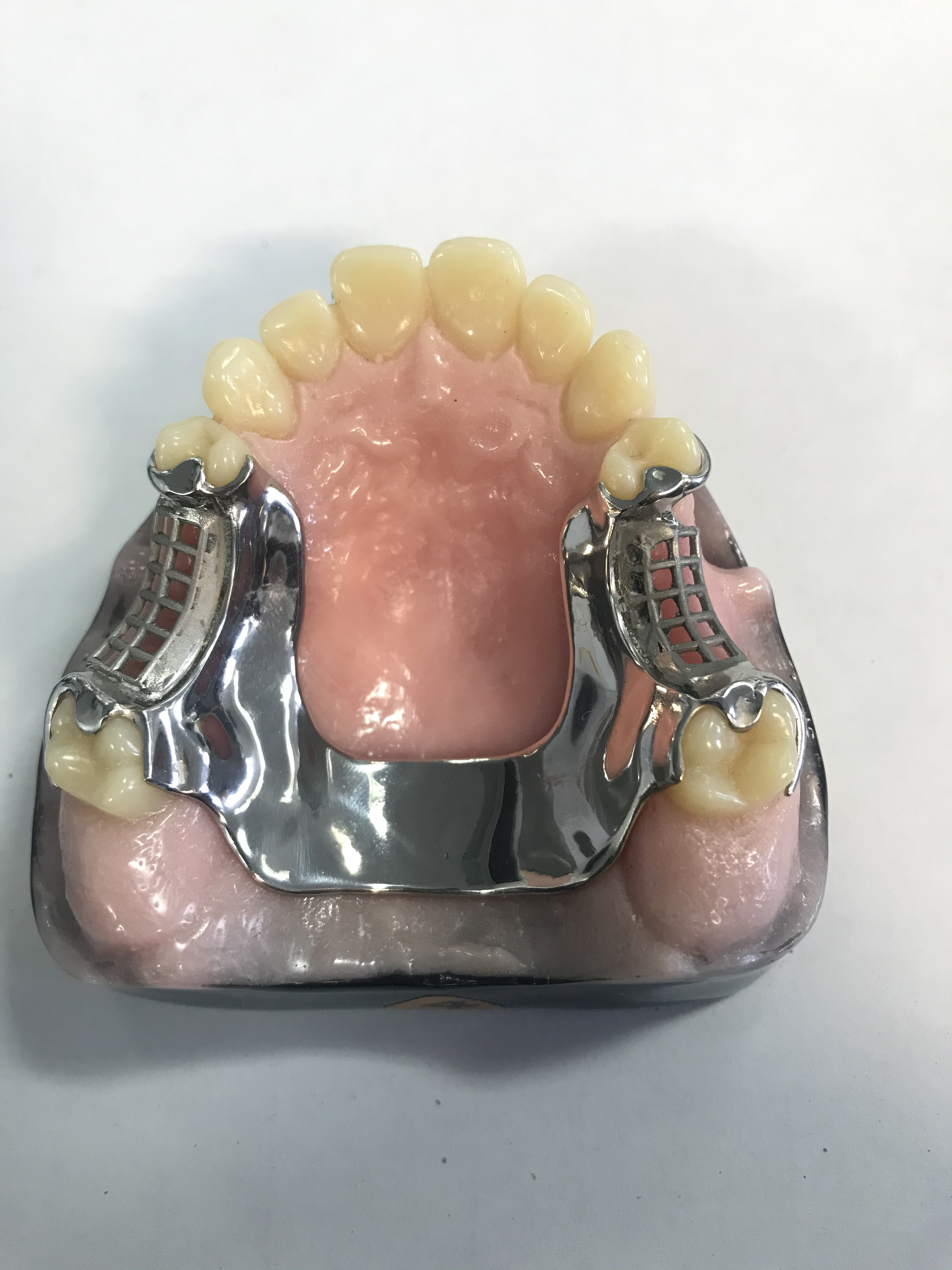
Palatal bar

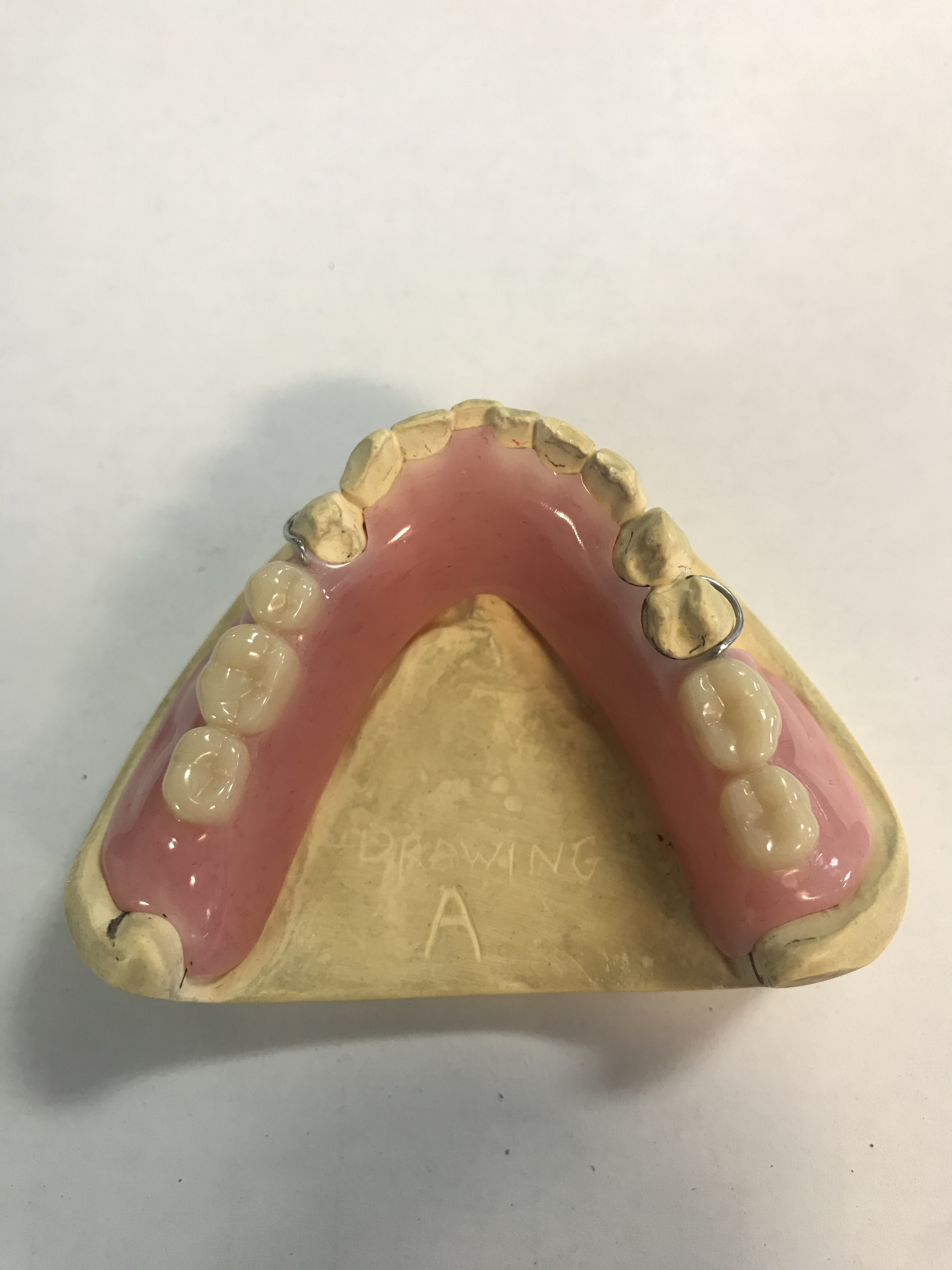
U-shaped or "horse shoe" denture

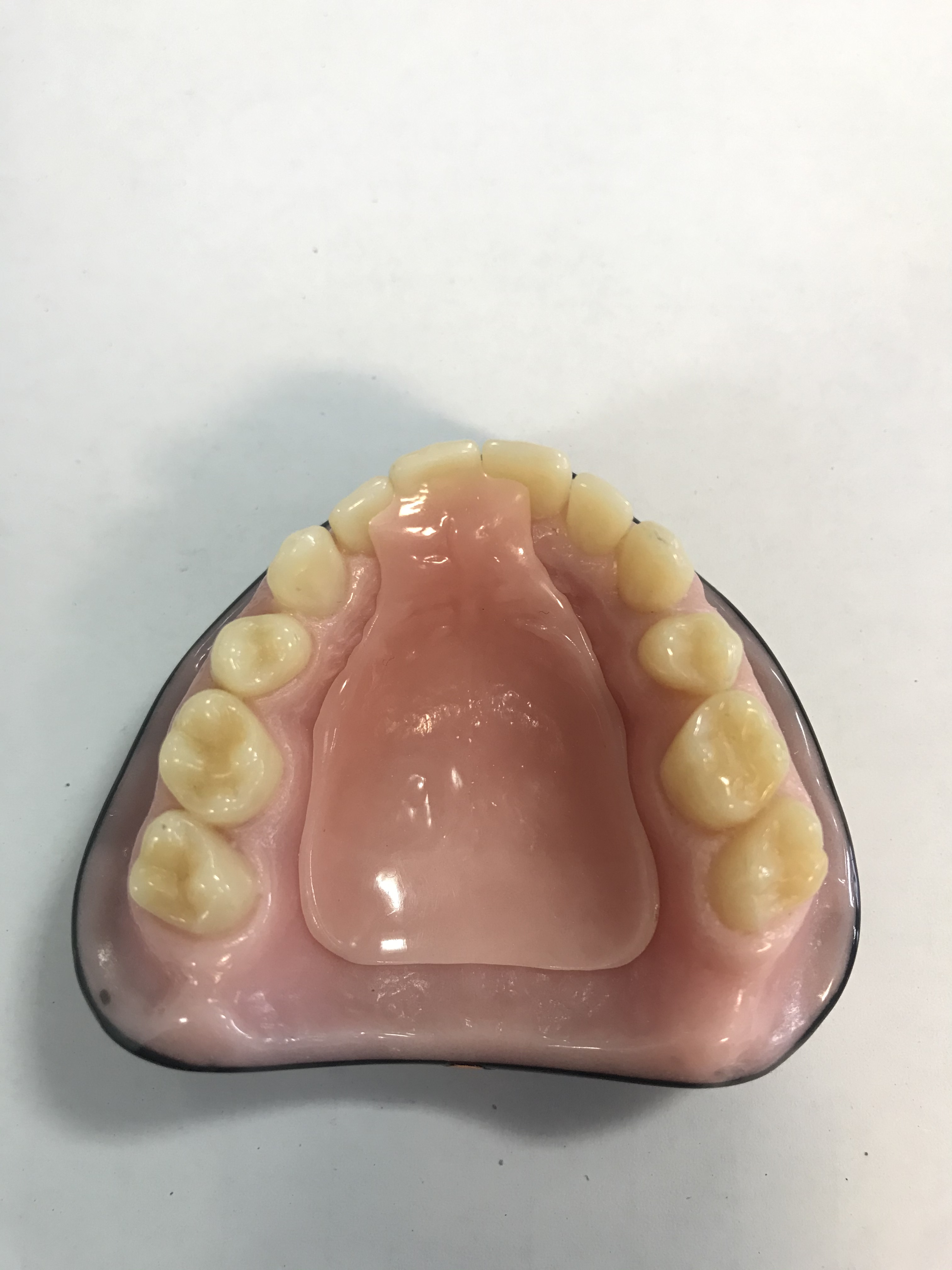
Spoon denture

There are many options for major connectors for removable upper partial dentures. The type of connector used will vary depending on the specific circumstances and the results of a comprehensive examination and discussion with the patient. Commonly used major connectors are outlined in the table below along with details of factors affecting the choice of using them.

==== Plate ====
Advantages of plates are that they are useful when several teeth are missing or there are multiple saddle. They also provide more retention, stability and support due to larger palatal coverage. Plates are useful when there are long distal extensions.

Disadvantages of plates are that they overs a lot of patients mouth so sometimes not well tolerated and also may affect phonetics. Plates can be problematic if there is a torus palatinus.

==== Palatal bar (Strap/Anterior-Posterior) ====
Advantages of these are their rigidity and minimal soft tissue coverage yet still having good resistance to deformation. A-P strap useful for Kennedy class I and II or if there is a torus. A-P strap gives greater distribution of stresses.

Disadvantages of these are that there is not much support due to less palatal coverage and also that is it bulky and so disliked by some patients.

==== U-shaped palatal bar (horseshoe connector) ====
Advantages of these are that they are useful in cases where we do not want to cover much of the palate e.g. if patient has a strong gag reflex, a large palatal torus or Kennedy class III.

Disadvantages of these are that they are flexible due to distal extensions which can have adverse effects on force transmission to abutment teeth. They can traumatic to the residual ridge.

==== Spoon denture ====
Advantages of these are that they are useful in small anterior saddles and are cheap to make.

Disadvantages of these are that they have large palatal coverage for a small saddle.

==== Palatal Strap/Bar (Single/Anterior, mid or Posterior) ====
Advantages of these are that single strap is useful for Kennedy class III and IV cases.

Disadvantage of these are that single strap requires careful placement if there is a torus palatinus. They are generally inappropriate for Kennedy Class 1 or 2.

=== Major connectors for lower teeth ===
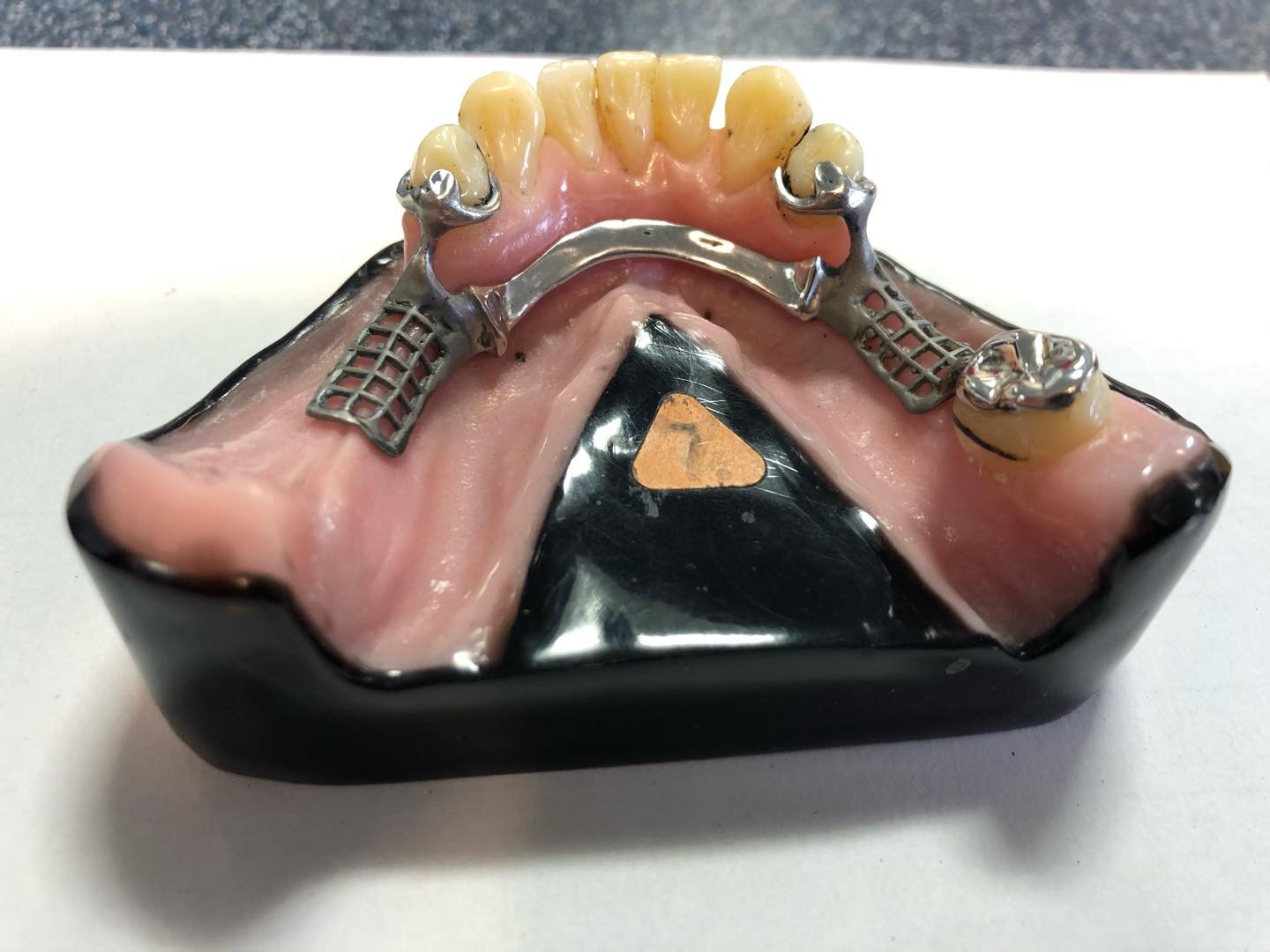
Lingual bar

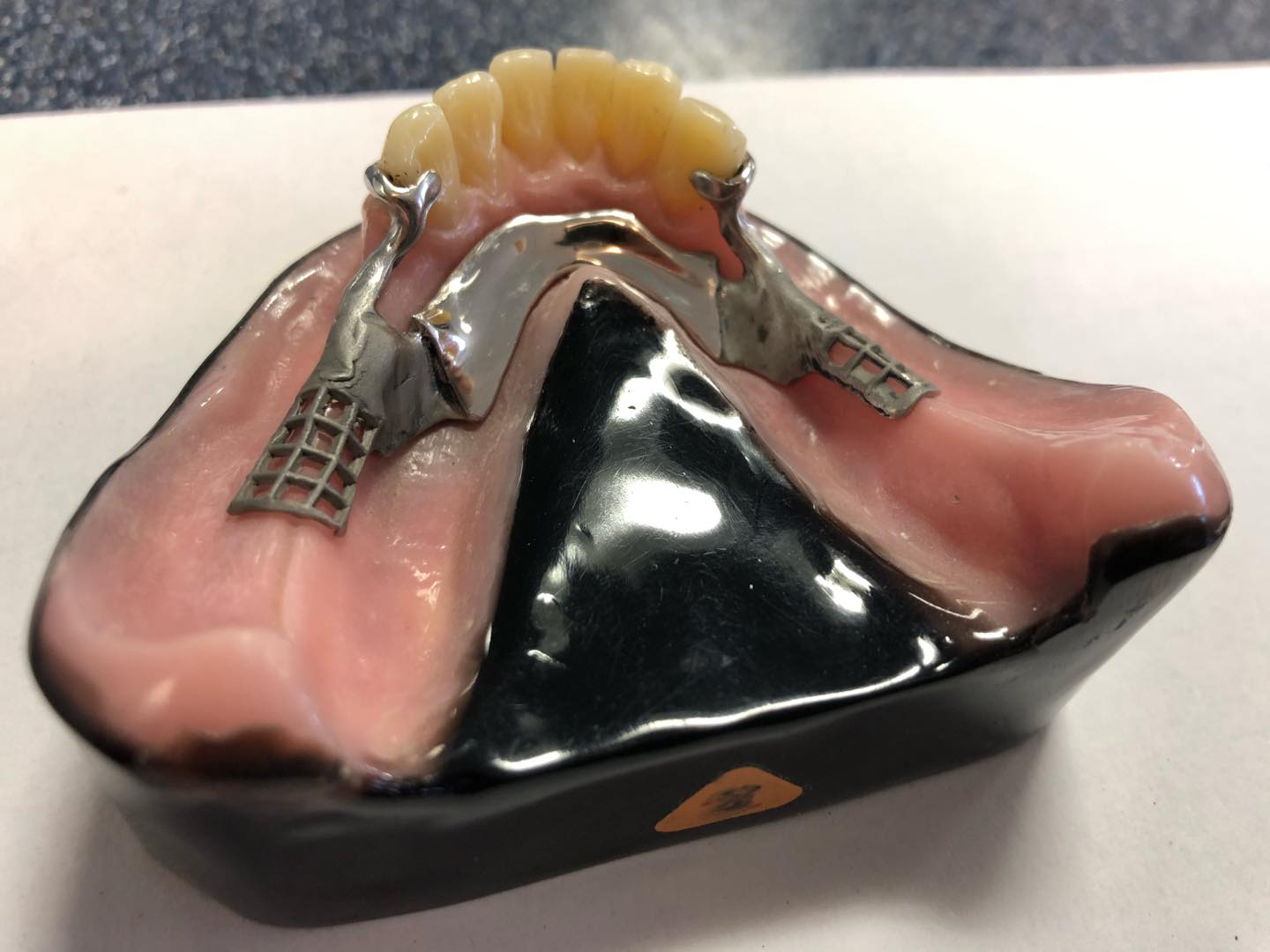
Sublingual bar

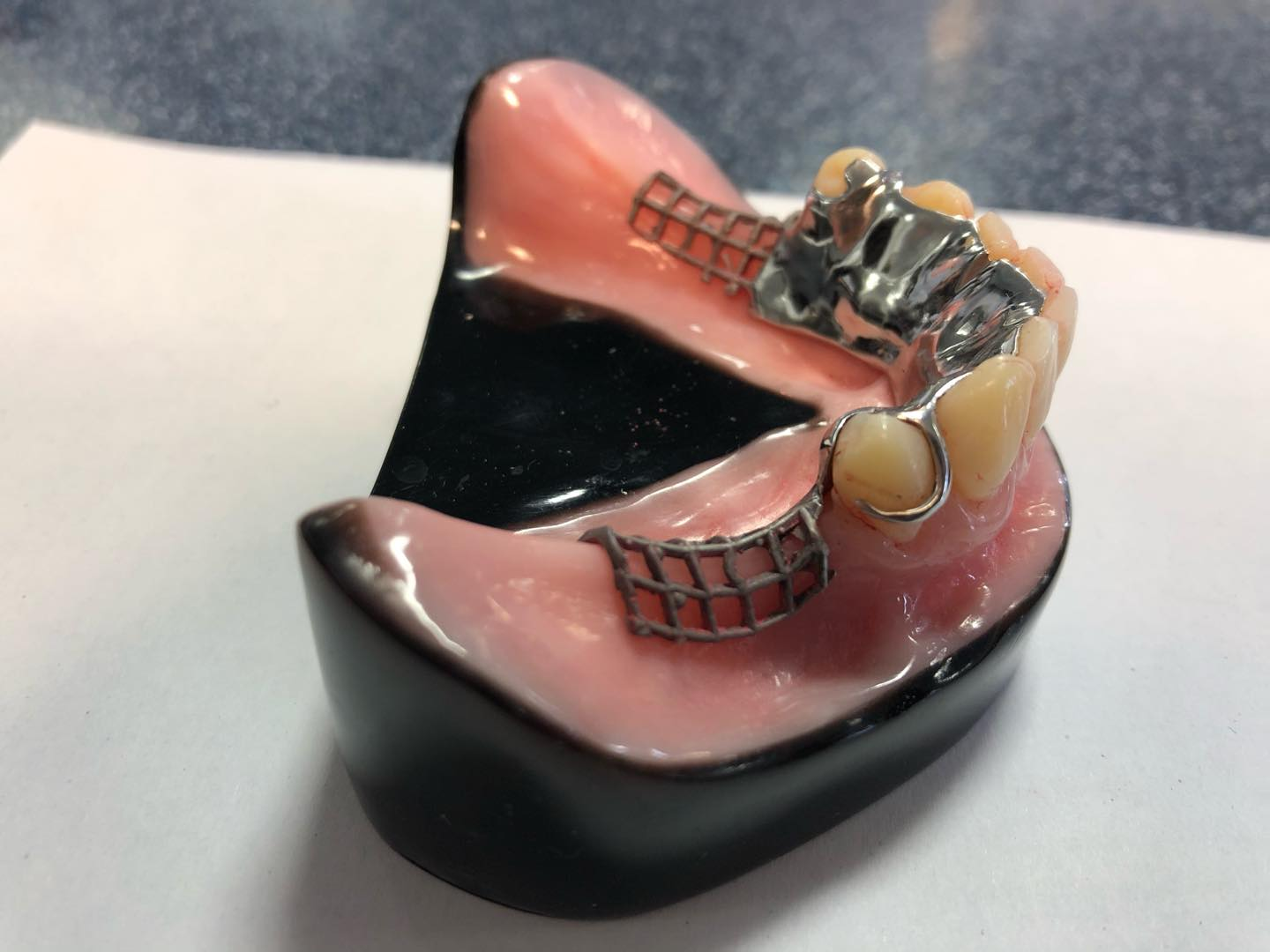
Lingual plate

A major connector is the part of a partial denture that links components on one side of the arch with those on the other. It must be strong and rigid enough to provide a suitable skeleton to the prosthesis and located so as not to damage the gingival or movable tissues. Five types of major connectors are listed below:

==== Lingual bar ====
A lingual bar has a pear-shaped cross section tapering towards the gingival boundary. It should be positioned high enough so as to not irritate the lower movable tissue but low enough to allow for a substantial quantity of material to be used to ensure stiffness. At least 7mm of space is usually required. It sits on the soft tissue posteriorly to the dentition. Along with the lingual plate it is the most commonly used type of connector in the lower arch.

A lingual bar is more hygienic than a lingual plate but is difficult to add to if teeth are later extracted and require to be added to the denture.

==== Sublingual bar ====
A sublingual bar is similar to a lingual bar but is located on the floor of the mouth posteriorly and inferiorly to its usual location. They are used when the superior border of a lingual bar would be positioned too closely to the gingival border. They are contraindicated in patients with a high lingual frenum and in situations where they may interfere with tongue movements.

==== Lingual Plate ====
A lingual plate is a thin plate contoured to the lingual surfaces of the lower anterior teeth. A lingual plate is useful when there is insufficient space for a lingual bar which would result in irritation of the gingival boundary.

If the teeth are spaced out and the patient does not wish for visible metal to be seen then an interrupted lingual plate may be used where the material is cut away where it would be visible anteriorly.

A disadvantage of a lingual plate is that it covers a lot of gingival margins and is less hygienic than a lingual bar. It should be used with caution in those patients with a high caries rate. A major advantage is that is easier to add teeth to a denture with a lingual plate than a lingual bar connector. In addition, it is useful in providing some additional support for mobile lower anterior teeth.

==== Buccal bar ====
In rare cases where the inclination of the remaining anterior teeth is problematic and the use of a lingual connector inappropriate, a buccal bar can be considered.

==== Continuous clasp ====
A continuous clasp is sometimes used in addition to a lingual bar and rarely as a sole major connector. It involves a bar of material placed along the cingulum of the anterior dentition.

The continuous clasp has the added advantage of providing indirect retention when used in addition to a lingual bar. It may be used when a lingual plate is compromising aesthetics.

== Support ==
Components that prevents displacement of the denture towards the tissues

If the denture solely rests on the remaining teeth, it is termed ‘tooth borne’, and if the denture lies solely on the mucoperiosteum, it is termed ‘mucosa borne’. In some cases where parts of the denture lies on periosteum and parts on the remaining teeth, it is called ‘tooth and mucosa borne’

‘Tooth borne’ dentures offer ideal tooth support, as the force is transmitted down the long axis of the tooth into the periodontal ligament. This will allow the dentures to feel like natural dentition, therefore feel more comfortable for the patient. The soft tissues are protected and resorption of the alveolar bone at the saddle areas is likely to be slow.

However, with ‘mucosa borne’ dentures. Force placed on these areas dissipates into the alveolar bone and will cause resorption over time. Dentures quickly begin to feel ill fitting as the shape of the alveolar ridge changes.

=== Tooth born/ tooth and mucosa borne ===
When choosing the teeth to support the denture, They must have the following qualities.

- as close to the saddle as possible
- healthy teeth
- healthy periodontal status
- large surface area of the roots

We place rests on the teeth for support.

Types of rests include:

- occlusal
- cingulum
- incisal

Rests placed on teeth must be an adequate size and thickness to ensure the occlusal load is directed down the long axis of the tooth, without impinging on the patient's occlusion. A periodontally healthy tooth will be able to sustain its own load in addition to 1.5 similar teeth.

=== Mucosa borne ===
Dentures covering a larger area spreads the load, reducing the magnitude of force placed on the mucosa, reducing the rate of resorption.

== Clasp design ==
Direct retainers may come in various designs:

- Cast circumferential clasp (suprabulge)
  - Akers'
  - Half and half
  - Back-action
  - Ring clasp
- Wrought wire clasp
- Roach clasp (infrabulge)
  - I-bar
  - T-bar
  - Y-bar
  - 7-bar
  - Flexible Clasp, such as Valplast and others, have become more popular due to their tissue color and comfort against porcelain abutments. These may be incorporated with these traditional metal designs or instead of any metal supports with caution and some limitations. A unilateral flexible partial called a Nesbit can be incorporated instead of fixed bridges with some success and significantly less cost.

Both cast circumferential and wrought wire clasps are supra bulge clasps, in that they engage an undercut on the tooth by originating coronal to the height of contour, while Roach clasps are infrabulge clasps and engage undercuts by approaching from the gingival.

In addition there are a couple of specific theories which include the clasp design:

- RPI: mesial rest, distolingual guide plate, I-bar
  - The RPI design was made for clasping a bilateral free end extension. These clasps are unique because they have to take into account extra torque force due to being tissue borne (and not tooth borne) at the posterior.
  - Described by Kratochvil in 1963 and modified by Krol in 1973
    - Kratochvil designed the abutment tooth with a long rest (from the mesial marginal ridge to the distal pit), long guide plane, and a regular I-bar clasp.
    - Krol modified this design with a short occlusal rest, short guide plane (touching only from occlusal to middle third), and a mesial-shifted I-bar. The theory behind Krol's decision was to allow for movement of the partial denture without placing too much torque on the abutment tooth.
  - An illustration of the RPI design function
- RPA: mesial rest, distolingual guide plate, Akers' clasp-style retentive arm
- RPC: mesial rest, distolingual guide plate, other type of cast circumferential clasp
  - So named in response to the RPI Philosophy introduced by Kratochvil and Kroll

== Indirect retention ==
Indirect retention is required to prevent displacement of saddles, such as free-end saddles or anterior saddle which is curved outside a straight line between the abutment teeth. Such indirect retention can only be achieved where both claps and rests work together to form lever system (Class III lever system) to retain the free part of denture.
