= Fixed prosthodontics =

Fixed prosthodontics is the branch of prosthodontics that focuses on dental prostheses that are permanently affixed (fixed). Crowns, bridges (fixed dentures), inlays, onlays, and veneers are some examples of indirect dental restorations. Prosthodontists are dentists who have completed training in this specialty that has been recognized by academic institutes. Fixed prosthodontics can be used to reconstruct single or many teeth, spanning tooth loss areas. The main advantages of fixed prosthodontics over direct restorations are improved strength in big restorations and the possibility to build an aesthetic-looking tooth. The concepts utilised to select the suitable repair, as with any dental restoration, include consideration of the materials to be used, the level of tooth destruction, the orientation and placement of the tooth, and the condition of neighboring teeth.

== Preparation techniques ==
A large amount of tooth structure is removed irreversibly during crown preparation. All restorations have impaired structural and functional integrity when compared to healthy, natural tooth structures. As a result, if a dental practitioner does not recommend it, crowning a tooth is probably not a good idea. Dentists trained worldwide at different institutions in different times may have varied ways of treatment planning and case selection, resulting in varying treatment recommendations.

Traditionally, crown and bridge work requires more than one visit, and the extra time necessary for the procedure can be a drawback; nevertheless, the improved benefits of such an intervention will generally outweigh these factors.

=== Dimensions of preparation ===
When preparing a tooth for a crown, the preparation should, ideally, exist entirely in the enamel. As elaborated below, the amount of tooth structure required to be removed will depend on the material(s) being used to restore the tooth. If the tooth is to be restored with a full gold crown, the restoration need only be .5 mm in thickness (as gold is very strong), and therefore, a minimum of only .5 mm of space needs to be made for the crown to be placed. If porcelain is to be applied to the gold crown, an additional minimum of 1 mm on functional cusp of tooth structure needs to be removed to allow for a sufficient thickness of the porcelain to be applied, thus bringing the total tooth reduction to minimally 1.5 mm. For porcelain or ceramic crowns the amount of tooth reduction is 2 mm. For metal, it is 1 mm.

If there is not enough tooth structure to properly retain the prosthetic crown, the tooth requires a build-up material. This can be accomplished with a pin-retained direct restoration, such as amalgam or a resin-like fluorocore, or in more severe cases, may require a post and core. Should the tooth require a post and core, endodontic therapy would then be indicated, as the post descends into the devitalized root canal for added retention. If the tooth, because of its relative lack of exposed tooth structure, also requires crown lengthening, the total combined time, effort, and cost of the various procedures, together with the decreased prognosis because of the combined inherent failure rates of each procedure, might make it more reasonable to have the tooth extracted and opt to have an implant placed.

=== Taper ===
The prepared tooth also needs to possess a certain degree of taper to allow for the restoration to be properly placed on the tooth. There can be no undercuts on the surface of the prepared tooth, as the restoration will not be able to be removed from the die or fit on the tooth (see explanation of lost-wax technique below for an understanding of the processes involved in crown fabrication). Conversely, too much taper will severely limit the grip that the crown has while on the prepared tooth, thus contributing to the failure of the restoration. Generally, 3° of taper around the entire circumference of the prepared tooth, giving a combined taper of 6° at any given sagittal section through the prepared tooth, is appropriate to both allow the crown to fit yet provide enough grip.

=== Margin ===
The most coronal position of untouched tooth structure (that is, the continual line of original, undrilled tooth structure at or near the gumline) is referred to as the margin. This margin will be the future continual line of tooth-to-restoration contact and should be a smooth, well-defined delineation so that the restoration, no matter how it is fabricated, can be properly adapted and not allow for any openings visible to the naked eye. An acceptable distance from the tooth margin to the restoration margin is anywhere from 40 to 100 nm. However, the R.V. Tucker method of gold inlay and onlay restoration produces tooth-to-restoration adaptation of potentially only 2 nm (confirmed by scanning electron microscopy), less than the diameter of a single bacterium.

The tooth-to-restoration margin is an unsightly thing to have exposed on the visible surface of a tooth when the tooth exists in the aesthetic zone of the smile. In these areas, the dentist places the margin as far apical (towards the root tip of the tooth) as possible, even below the gumline, though problems may arise when placing the margin too subgingivally (below the gumline). There may be issues in terms of capturing the margin in an impression to make the stone model of the prepared tooth (see stone model replication of tooth in photographs, above). Another important consideration is biological width. Biologic width is the mandatory distance to be left between the height of the alveolar bone and the margin of the restoration, and if this distance is violated because the margin is placed too subgingivally, serious repercussions may follow. In situations where the margin cannot be placed apically enough to provide for proper retention of the prosthetic crown on the prepared tooth structure, the tooth or teeth involved should undergo a crown lengthening procedure.

There are a number of different types of margins that can be placed for restoration with a crown. There is the chamfer, which is popular with full gold restorations, which effectively removes the smallest amount of tooth structure. There is also a shoulder which removes slightly more tooth structure but allows for a thickness of the restoration material, necessary when applying porcelain to a PFM coping or when restoring with an all-ceramic crown (see below for elaboration on various types of crowns and their materials). When using a shoulder preparation, the dentist adds a bevel; the shoulder-bevel margin serves to effectively decrease the tooth-to-restoration distance upon final cementation of the restoration.

=== Ferrule effect ===
The most important consideration when restoring with a crown is, the incorporation of the ferrule effect. As with the bristles of a broom, which are grasped by a ferrule when attached to the broomstick, the crown should envelop a certain height of tooth structure to properly protect the tooth from fracture after being prepared for a crown. This has been established through multiple experiments as a mandatory continuous circumferential height of 2 mm; any less provides for a significantly higher failure rate of endodontically treated crown-restored teeth. When a tooth is not endodontically treated, the remaining tooth structure will invariably provide the 2-mm height necessary for a ferrule, but endodontically treated teeth are notoriously decayed and are often missing significant solid tooth structure. Contrary to popular belief, endodontically treated teeth are not brittle after being devitalized according to the following study -CM Sedglay & Messer 1992 Journal of Endodontics. Contrary to what some dentists believe, a bevel is not suitable for implementing the ferrule effect, and a beveled tooth structure may not be included in the 2 mm of required tooth structure for a ferrule.

== Restoration types ==
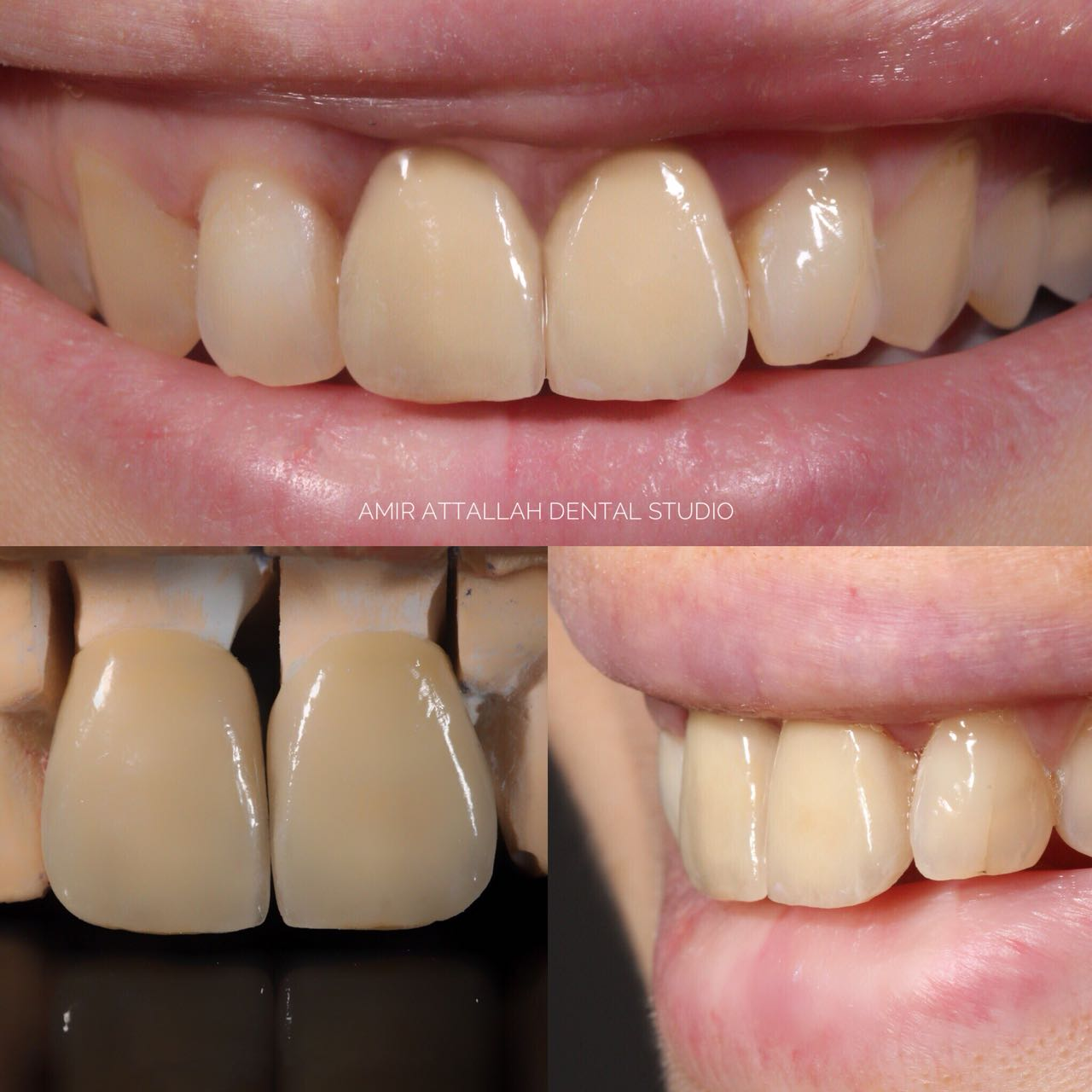
Fabrication of feldspathic porcelain crowns on the dental model, then cementing them on the upper central teeth using a luting agent

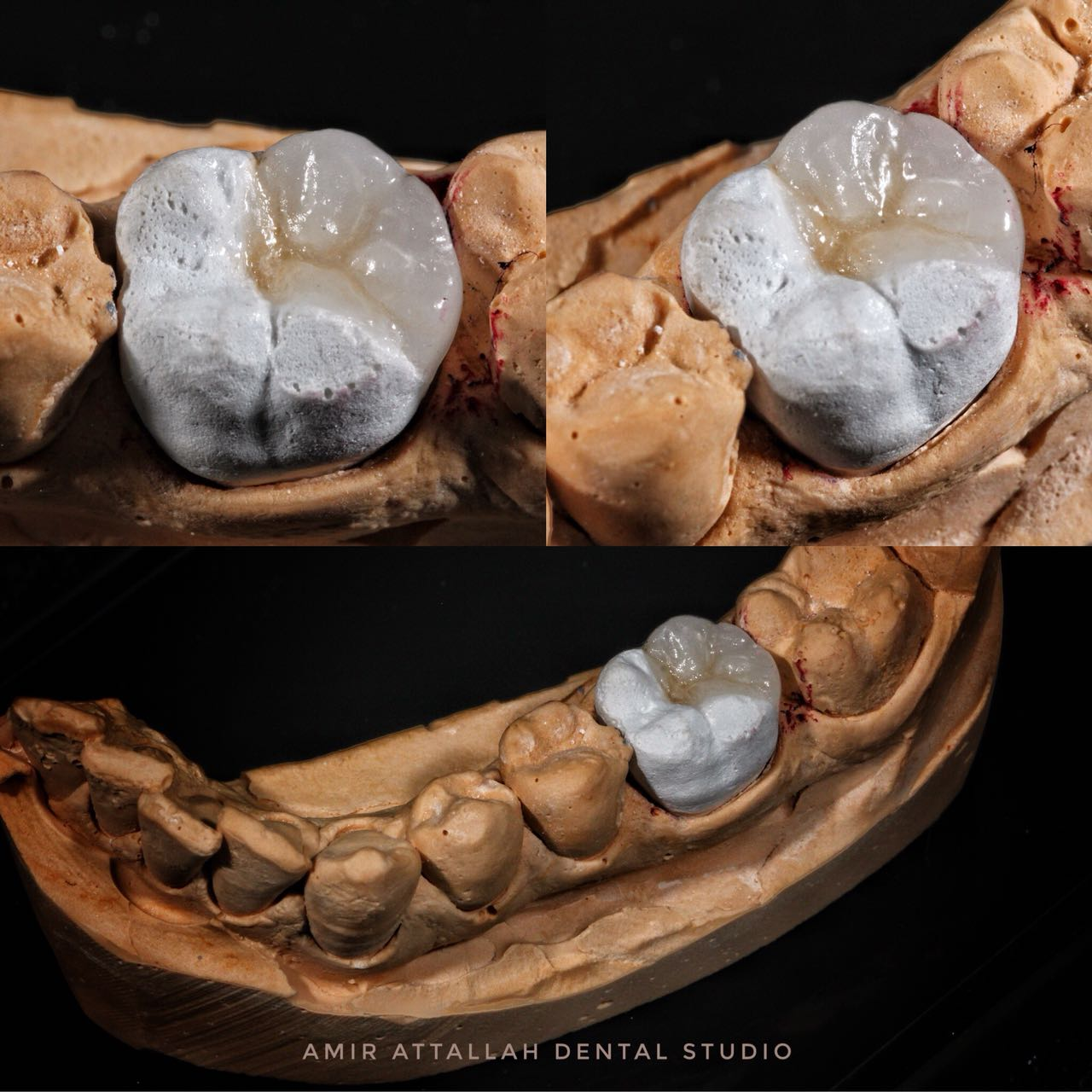
An inlay fitted into the model and ready to be cemented clinically on the natural tooth

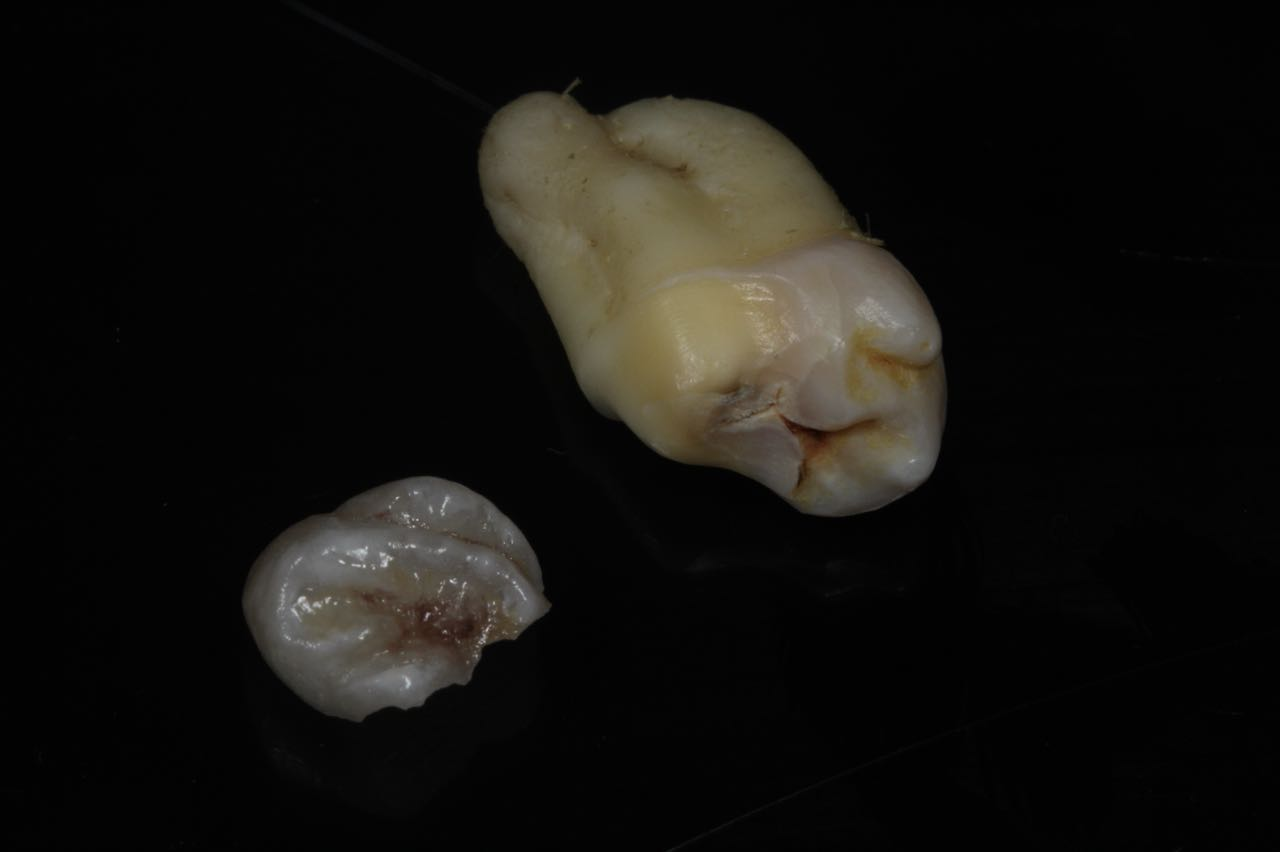
A sample of feldspathic onlay made with refractory die technique using VM9 vita porcelain

=== Crown ===
A crown is used to cover a tooth and may be commonly referred to as a "cap." Traditionally, the teeth to be crowned are prepared by a dentist, and records are given to a dental technician to construct the prosthesis. The records include models, which are replicas of a patient's teeth, and the impressions used to make these models. There are many different methods of crown fabrication, each using a different material. Some methods are quite similar and utilize either very similar or identical materials. Crowns may be made of gold or other similar metals, porcelain, or a combination of the two. Crowns made of Zirkonia Oxide are being made more popular due to their high translucency and durability as opposed to the chipping disadvantages of porcelain crowns.

=== Bridge ===
A bridge is used to span, or bridge, an edentulous area (space where teeth are missing), usually by connecting to fixed restorations on adjacent teeth. The teeth used to support the bridge are called abutments. A bridge may also refer to a single-piece multiple-unit fixed partial denture (numerous single-unit crowns either cast or fused together). The part of the bridge which replaces a missing tooth and attaches to the abutments is known as a "pontic". For multiple missing teeth, some cases may have several pontics.

=== Inlay ===
An inlay is a restoration that lies within the confines of the cusps. These restorations are considered to be more conservative than onlays or crowns because less tooth structure is removed in preparation for the restoration. They are usually used when tooth destruction is less than half the distance between cusp tips.

=== Onlay ===
An onlay is a method of tooth restoration, that covers, protects, or reinforces one or more cusps. Onlays are methods for restoring teeth in an indirect way. Onlays are often used when teeth present extensive destruction due to caries or to trauma.

=== Veneer ===
A veneer is a thin layer of restorative material placed over a tooth surface, either to improve the esthetics of a tooth or to restore a damaged tooth surface. Materials used for veneers may include composite and porcelain. In some cases, removal of tooth structure is needed to provide sufficient space for the veneer, whereas sometimes a restoration may be bonded to a tooth without preparation of the tooth.

=== Dental implants ===
==== Screw-retained restoration ====
The main benefit of screw retention is the retrievability of the restoration.

This does not exist in common fixed prosthodontics on teeth. As a result, any complication with the restoration is easily addressed. The screw-retained restoration can be easily removed which allows to repair or examine the soft tissue and direct visualization of the implant. This also negates the need to remake the restoration if an abutment screw or prosthetic screw loosens. This eliminates the potential complications associated with excess residual cement—often difficult to completely remove with a cement-retained crown. The screw-retained restoration lacks glue and hence is preferable for the health of the gingiva and the implant.

==== Cement-retained restoration ====
The cement-retained restorations ensure maximum aesthetics but have two downsides.

One, the restoration is cemented to an abutment that is screw retained. If the abutment screw becomes loose the final restoration cannot be removed without destroying it in many instances. This results in a remake and increased cost. Two, excess cement along the implant surface can potentially act as a medium for colonization by bacteria and can jeopardize the attachment, ultimately resulting in implant failure. In certain instances, cement retention is the only option.

== See also ==
- Dentures
- Dental restoration
- Dental materials
