= Bite registration =

Technique in dentistry

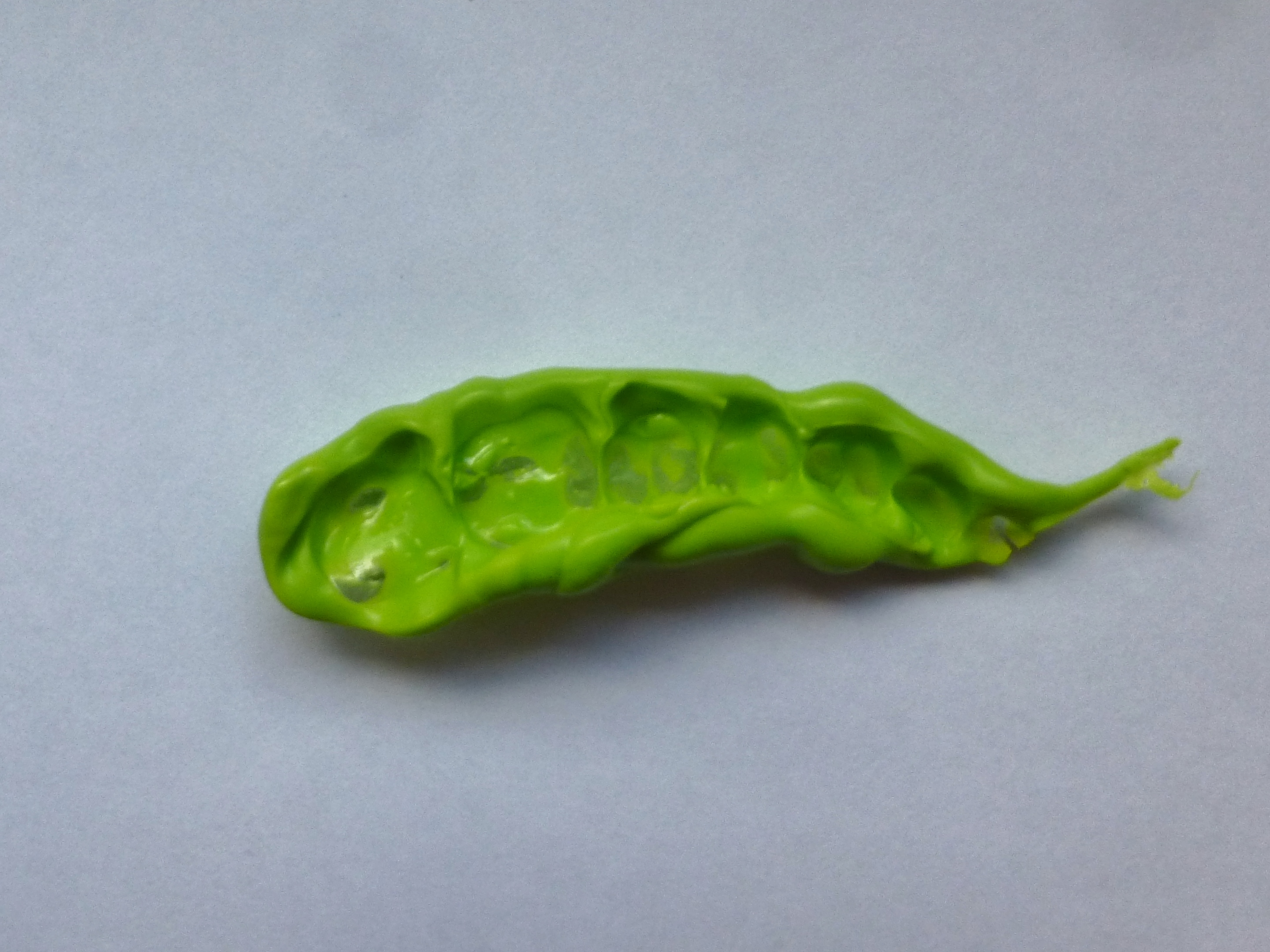
A dental impression of a section of teeth which records the bite, which can be used to replicate how the teeth bite together

Bite registration is a technique carried out in dental procedures, where an impression is taken of the teeth while biting together, to capture the way they meet together in a bite. This process is crucial for creating dental restorations, such as crowns, bridges, and dentures, as well as for diagnosing and treating bite-related issues like temporomandibular joint disorders (TMD). Bite registration helps dentists to ensure proper alignment of the teeth in the upper and lower jaw, leading to optimal function, comfort, and aesthetics. Various methods and materials are used to record bite registrations, depending on the specific needs of the patient and the type of treatment.

== Introduction ==
Bite registration is used to record the position that the teeth meet. This ensure that jaws of the face meet in a way that allows effective function but is not damaging to the jaw joint, known as the temporomandibular joint (TMJ), when creating a dental prosthesis or restoration. This is equally important for those who are edentulous (have no teeth), those with few teeth or those with a full, healthy dentition.

Recording bite registration (also referred to as occlusal registration) allows 3-dimensional recognition of how both the upper and lower jaws normally contact - when chewing and at-rest - in relation to one another. This relationship is controlled by the TMJ, muscles aiding chewing and teeth. The information gained from bite registration can be transferred to a stone cast of teeth, which is imperative when planning direct (fillings); indirect (crowns, dentures, bridges, mouthguards and orthodontics) and provisional restorations; implants; craniomaxillofacial surgeries; orthognathic surgeries or when a dentist plans to change the way in which a patient's teeth meet, such as orthodontic treatment.

A wax bite-block/occlusal rim will be used to record the bite in those with inadequate tooth contact such as people who have few teeth, allowing a record of how the jaws to meet together.

Dental technicians working in the laboratory require the information obtained from registering a patient's bite to fabricate indirect restorations such as crowns and bridges. Using this, they can set-up an articulator - a "stand" capable of imitating jaw movements on which a model of the patient's teeth sits - and arrange the model in the correct positions to best suit the patient.

Bite registration aims for an accurately fitting final prosthesis where:

- Teeth meet where they look/feel best.
- Majority of biting force is absorbed by the posterior teeth.
- The tongue can contact the soft palate.
- The patient can reliably reproduce the position.

== Centric Relation ==
Centric relation (CR) is where the lower jaw is in the most optimal position with the upper jaw. This is integral to bite registration success and is unrelated to the way the teeth meet together when biting. This is a useful reference point when recording the way the teeth meet as if centric relation is not considered, prostheses made could interfere with normal masticatory (chewing) function, causing instability, discomfort and may lead to temporomandibular joint dysfunction (TMD).

When recording a bite, the dentist may manipulate the lower jaw and push it backwards to ensure centric relation is achieved.

== History ==
Recording of a patient's bite registration has been common practice for over 400 years. Early dental restorations were typically designed to replace missing teeth without much focus on how the teeth should align and fit together in a functional bite.

In the late 18th century, as the field of dentistry began to formalise, dentists started focusing on improving the fit and function of dentures. Pierre Fauchard, a French dentist often considered the "father of modern dentistry", contributed significantly to the development of techniques for restoring teeth. Fauchard emphasized the importance of fitting dentures that balanced by taking into account the relationship between the upper and lower jaws. Until the mid-19th century, wax was the only material used to record an impression of the teeth, and then gutta-percha was first used.

In the 20th century, dentists began using impression materials like modeling compound, wax, and later, elastomers (rubber-like substances), to record the patient's bite.

Generally, bite registration is currently completed using a variety of impression materials and related tools, but with technological advancements, use of innovative digital intraoral scanners is on the rise. Although the outcome should be the same no matter the technique, intraoral scanners can minimise patient discomfort.

== Indications ==
The purpose of bite registration is to convey how the upper and lower jaw are vertically and horizontally positioned against each other when the patient bites together. An unchanged bite is usually preferred, and where change is preferred, it is necessary to control how the bite changes and by how much. Once a patient's bite has been registered, this information can then be used to mount dental models onto an articulator in a manner that resembles how the patient normally bites, a process known as 'articulation'.

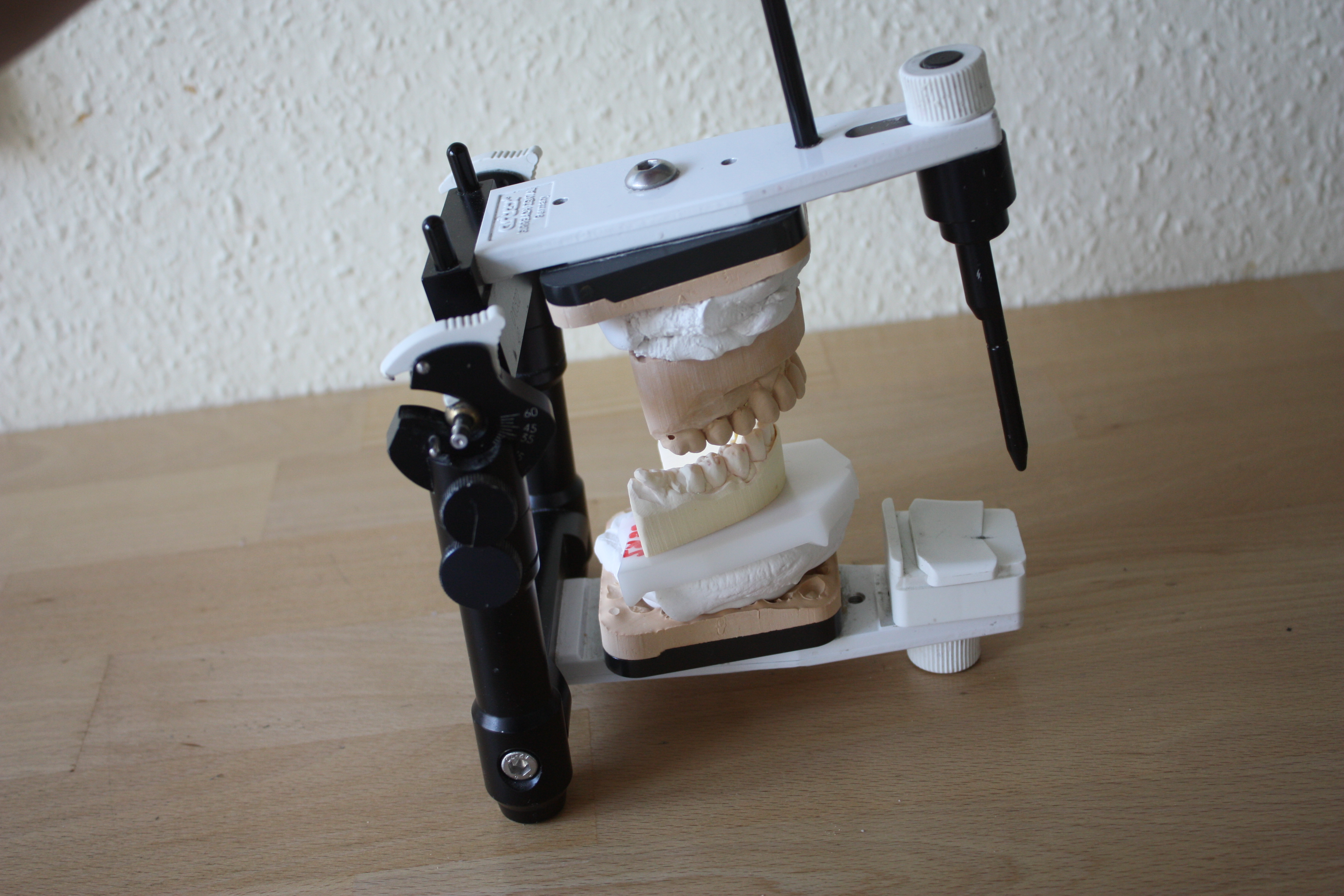
an articulator set up with the upper and lower dental arch in place

The most accurate method of articulating tooth models is via "hand articulation". With this method, pairs of teeth (1 upper tooth and 1 lower tooth), from at least 3 different locations on the jaws, that contact each other when the patient bites together are identified and recorded by bite registration, these teeth (known as index teeth) are then positioned together on the models to reproduce the bite. This method is indicated where it is feasible.

Where insufficient index teeth are present in a dentition for a stable hand articulation, a material (see 'Materials' section) is bit on by the patient, on which tooth imprints can then be used to articulate the models appropriately. This method may be more commonly required for (but not limited to).

1. Multiple adjacent teeth requiring restoration, especially for fixed restorations;

2. Last standing molar in either side of an arch, as it may be the first tooth to make contact with the opposite jaw when the patient bites;

3. Restorative work involving the last tooth on an arch, as it would be the first tooth to make contact with the opposite jaw when the patient bites;

4. Tooth completely missing in the opposite jaw, such as in denture cases;

5. Multiple teeth located next to each other that do not contact the opposite jaw due to tooth wear;

6. Individual crowns

Recent advancements in CAD/CAM technology has also allowed teeth to be scanned and recreated as digital models, which may then be used to identify index teeth or even algorithmically recreate the patient's bite to a similar accuracy as hand articulation, which may be useful for crown and bridgework.

== Materials ==
Bite registration can be achieved using a variety of materials including, zinc oxide-eugenol paste, thermoplastic wax, elastomers, impression plaster, acrylic resin, T-scan, pressure-sensitive films, transparent acetate sheet and occlusion sonography.

The material used should not change the position of the teeth but should accurately record the occlusal and incisal surfaces of the teeth. The ideal material has a low viscosity, low resistance to closure, easy manipulation, adequate working time, precision in detail, rapid hardening, and is dimensionally stable.

High viscosity materials pose the risk of displacing teeth affected by periodontal issues, resulting in jaw misalignment and inaccurate jaw registration. The material chosen should allow for both passive and precise placement of dental casts. Materials that are rigid or possess high surface reproducibility may hinder the easy seating of casts, often necessitating forceful articulation of the models.

=== Thermoplastic waxes ===
Thermoplastic waxes are commonly used for bite registration, serving either as records themselves or as carriers for registration. These waxes are versatile and widely embraced material largely due to its affordability and ease of handling. Thermoplastic waxes have the advantage of being versatile, affordable and have ease of handling. However, they have a poor dimensional stability.

=== Zinc oxide-eugenol paste ===
Zinc oxide-eugenol paste serves as a reliable and efficient material for bite registration. Therefore, it is recommended to use minimal amounts of zinc oxide-eugenol to prevent excessive flash, which can impede the precise seating of casts. Zinc oxide-eugenol pastes have the advantage of being rigid, having good flow, dimensionally stable and having an ease of application. However, they have a long setting time, are brittle and adhere to the teeth which leads to a loss of detail in the impression. They are also only usable in custom tray and have been known to cause a burning sensation of the mucosa.

=== Impression Plaster ===
Impression plaster is a historic material which can be used for bite registration. Its primary component is calcined calcium sulfate hemihydrate, which, upon mixing with water, reacts to form a rigid mass of calcium sulfate dihydrate. Plaster of Paris is a plaster material used for casting impressions, impression plaster for bite registration consists of plaster of Paris with additives, more water can be added to the powder than with the casting material to provide more flow for taking the impression. These additives hasten the setting time and reduce setting expansion. Impression plaster advantages include having a good flow, and dimensional stability while also being accurate. However, they are brittle and prone to fracture especially where undercuts are present. They are also an untidy material with difficult handling properties.

=== Alginate ===
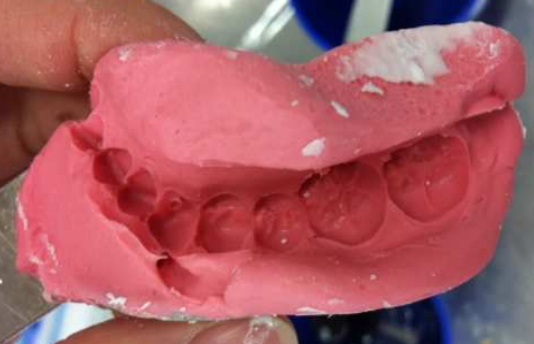
Alginate impression of the upper dental arch

Alginate is an elastic irreversible hydrocolloid and one of the most common impression materials. It has a mixing time of 45–60 seconds and is fast setting. Advantages of alginate are it has good surface detail, it is elastic so it works well with undercuts, it has a low wetting angle and it is cheap with a fast setting time. However, alginate has a poor tear strength and it cannot be used for bite registration against a Polyvinyl siloxane (PVS) impression as poor articulation will result from the lack of surface detail. For a PVS impression, bite registration should be taken with a PVS material or an alginate substitute.

=== Elastomers ===
Elastomers were introduced to overcome the disadvantages of acrylic resins. There are two varieties of silicone elastomers used for bite registration: condensation silicone and addition silicone. Polyester Elastomeric compounds, condensation elastomers, are made from polyether terminated with amino groups cross linked with strong acids. The advantages of elastomers as an impression material include its high dimensional stability, ease of manipulation, low resistance to closure, ease of trimming with no distortion and its good elastic recovery after deformation. However, elastomers have a low to moderate tear strength and have a short working time. they are also very stiff materials and cannot be immersed in disinfecting solutions for longer than 10 minutes due to hydrophilic nature.

=== Acrylic resins ===
Acrylic resins were introduced as a bite registration material in 1961 to overcome the disadvantages of other bite registration materials. Acrylic resin is an accurate and rigid material post setting, however the material contracts on setting, therefore is not dimensionally stable. Once cured, the material can also damage the stone model due to its rigidity, therefore are not in current use.

=== Silicones ===
Silicones are synthetic compounds composed of silicone and oxygen linked together to form a 16 siloxane chain. Elastomeric materials are beneficial when recording the intermaxillary relationship for an unstable occlusion, however are not the first materials of choice for bite registration. Polyvinyl siloxane is an addition silicone which is chemically similar to impression silicones with modifications to the flexibility. The advantages of Polyvinyl siloxane include its accuracy, ease of handling and dimensional stability. However, the material shrinks on curing and has a short working time.

== Techniques ==
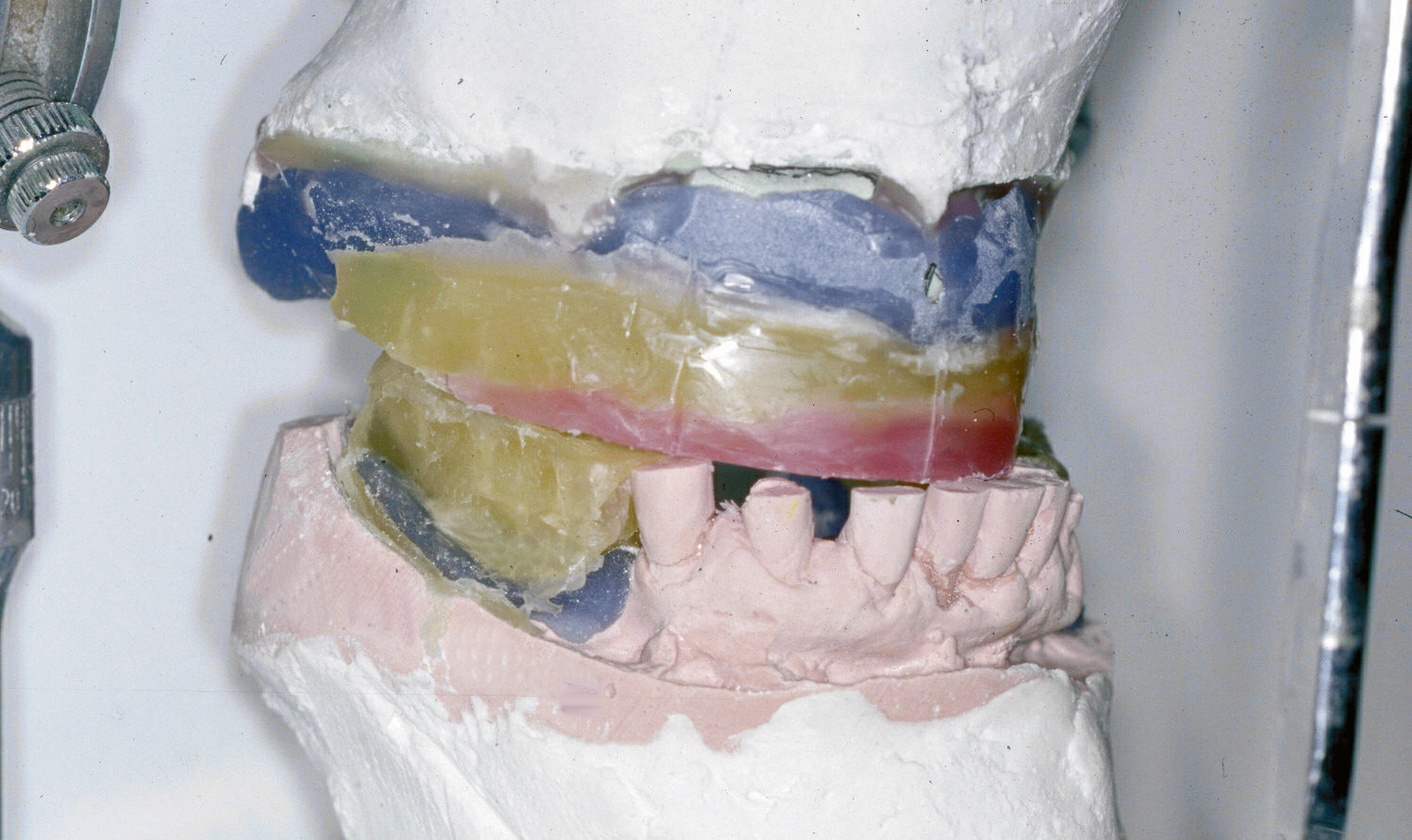
Two sets of wax blocks, on dental models, which can be used to show how the patient bites together

=== Occlusal wax rims (wax record blocks) ===
This technique is used when the edentulous area is large or when opposing teeth do not meet. Occlusal rims can be mounted on record bases, made from various materials like Shellac or resin.

Wax occlusal rims should be reduced in height until the opposing teeth are not touching the rims. Jaw relation record is made in a uniformly soft material which sets to a hard state such as quick-setting impression plaster, bite registration paste silicone. In this instance record blocks act as carriers for a more accurate registration medium (e.g. silicone).

Another method involves the use of wax rims as a recording medium, as opposed to a carrier. In this instance, the indent of opposing teeth is recorded directly in the wax without using any other registration medium.

When no occlusal contact exists between the remaining natural teeth, jaw relation records are made entirely on occlusion rims. The same method is used for complete dentures and the use of a face bow is implemented.

=== Digital cad cam technique ===
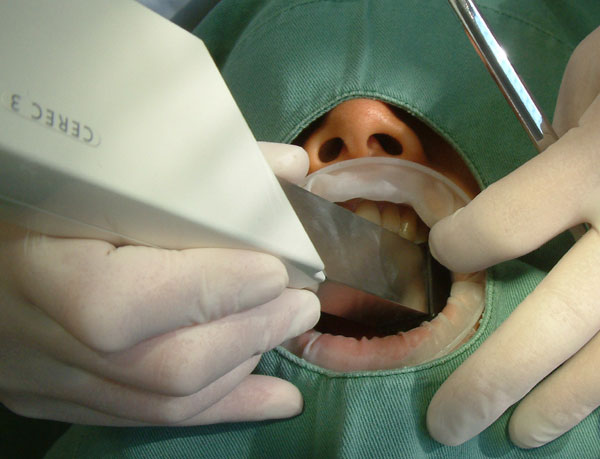
A intraoral scan being taken

A range of intraoral scanners are available to allow data acquisition of the dental arches or tooth preparation(s), which is coupled to software for designing the virtual restoration(s) and a computerised milling device to construct the definitive restoration. Following scanning of the dental area of specific interest to obtain a digital impression, an instant interocclusal record can be obtained by taking a buccal scan of the teeth in the intercuspal position. Another system involves placing registration material over the prepared tooth only, and a scan is taken to determine the occlusal relationship.

== Application ==
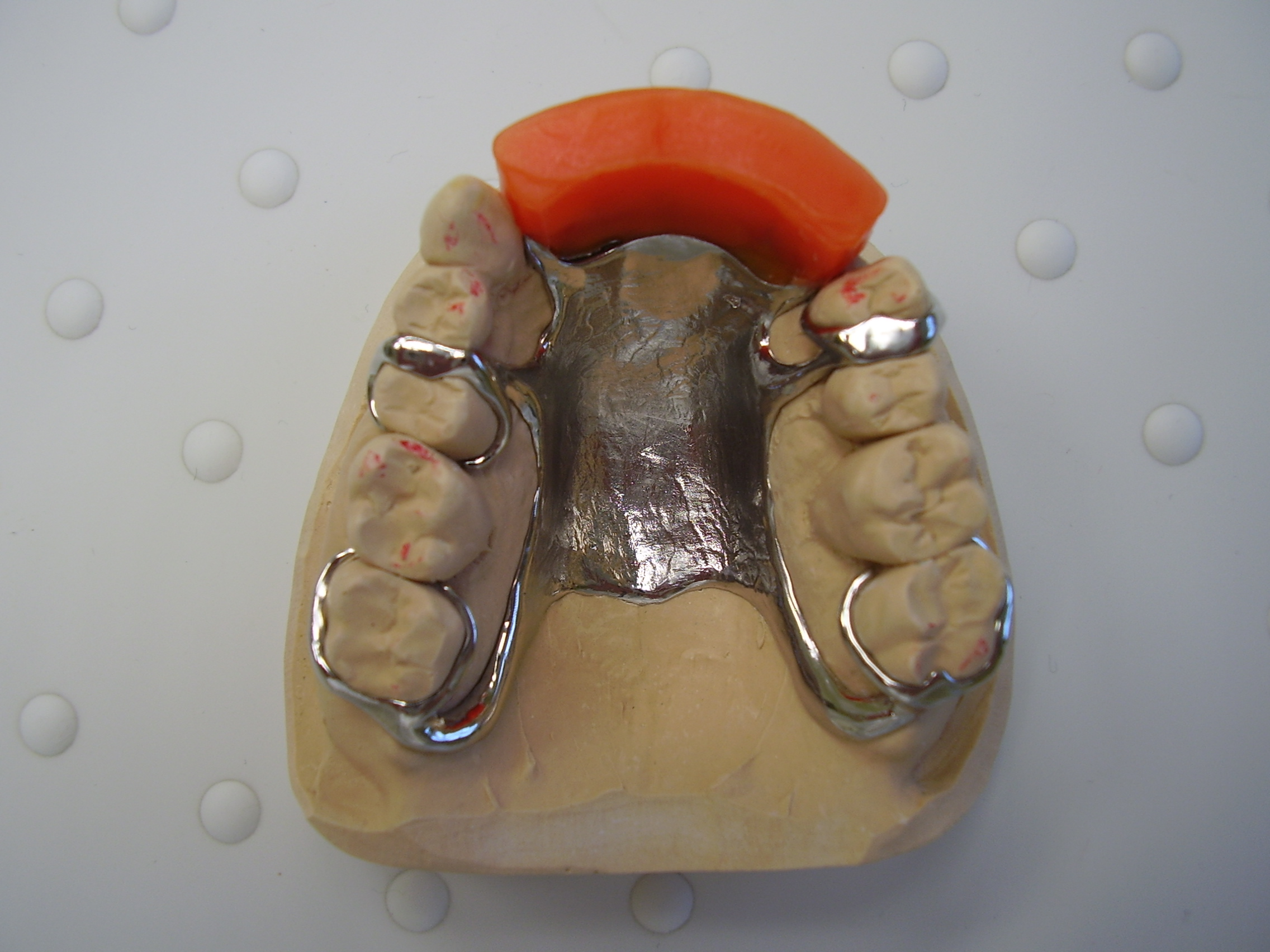
a cobalt chrome denture with a block of wax, ready to have the patients bite recorded.

Bite registration is used in several dental treatments, including a wide range of prosthetic restorations such as inlays/ onlays, crowns, bridges, frameworks and partial and full dentures. It is also an essential technique for implants, orthodontic diagnosis and treatment planning, and temporomandibular joint disorder treatment such as soft splints.

=== Importance of application ===
Without bite registration, when fitting a restoration it may result in a high bite, as it has not been recorded where the opposing tooth would sit. A high bite can lead to the crown failing, pain and difficulty eating and speaking. A high bite can cause excessive pressure on your teeth, which can erode the enamel and expose the dentin layer, it may also damage the restoration by putting too much force on it during eating. If one tooth or a set of teeth is hitting harder than others due to a high bite, it can cause localized pain, inflammation, or sensitivity. The constant pressure on these teeth may irritate the pulp inside the tooth or cause gum inflammation or recession around the affected area. This can make your teeth more sensitive to hot and cold temperatures. An uneven bite can strain the jaw muscles, joints, and nerves, which can lead to jaw pain.
