= Occlusion (dentistry) =

In dentistry, contact between teeth

Occlusion, in a dental context, means simply the contact between teeth. More technically, it is the relationship between the maxillary (upper) and mandibular (lower) teeth when they approach each other, as occurs during chewing or at rest.

Static occlusion refers to contact between teeth when the jaw is closed and stationary, while dynamic occlusion refers to occlusal contacts made when the jaw is moving.

The masticatory system also involves the periodontium, the TMJ (and other skeletal components) and the neuromusculature, therefore the tooth contacts should not be looked at in isolation, but in relation to the overall masticatory system.

== Anatomy of Masticatory System ==
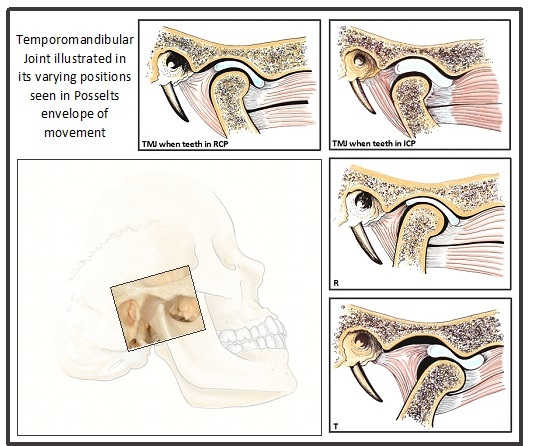
Anatomy of the temporomandibular joint - RCP = Here we see the condyle when teeth are in the retruded contact position, a reproducible position. ICP = Here we see the condyle position when teeth are in the intercuspal position. R = Mandibular opening with rotation of the condylar heads but without translation. T = Maximum opening of the mandible combined rotation and translation of condylar heads. (Institute of Dentistry, Aberdeen University)

One cannot fully understand occlusion without an in depth understanding of the anatomy including that of the teeth, TMJ, musculature surrounding this and the skeletal components.

=== The Dentition and Surrounding Structures ===
The human dentition consists of 32 permanent teeth and these are distributed between the alveolar bone of the maxillary and mandibular arch. Teeth consist of two parts: the crown, which is visible in the mouth and lies above the gingival soft tissue and the roots, which are below the level of the gingiva and in the alveolar bone.

The periodontal ligament unites the cementum on the outside of the root and the alveolar bone. This bundle of connective tissue fibres is vital in dissipating forces that are applied to the underlying bone during the contact of teeth in function.

The teeth are highly specialised and different teeth are involved in specific functions. The masticatory system is largely influenced by these intra and inter-arch relationships and a wider understanding of the anatomy can greatly benefit those who want to understand occlusion.

=== Skeletal Components ===
The maxilla forms a crucial aspect of the upper facial skeleton. Two irregularly shaped bones fuse at the intermaxillary suture during development forming the upper jaw. This forms the palate of the oral cavity and also supports the alveolar ridges that hold the upper teeth in place. The lower facial skeleton on the other hand, is formed of the mandible, a U-shaped bone, which supports the lower teeth and also forms part of the TMJ. The mandibular condyle and the squamous portion of the temporal bone, at the base of the cranium articulate with one another.

=== TMJ ===
The TMJ is formed from the temporal bone of the cranium, specifically the glenoid fossa and articular tubercle and the condyle of the mandible, with a fibrocartilaginous disc lying in between. It is classified as a ginglymoarthrodial joint and can perform a range of gliding and hinge type movements. The disc, which lies in between is composed of dense fibrous tissue and is predominantly avascular and lacking nerves.

=== Muscles ===
There are various muscles that contribute to occlusion of the teeth including the muscles of mastication and other accessory muscles. The temporalis, masseter, medial and lateral pterygoids are the muscles of mastication and these contribute to the elevation, depression, protrusion and retraction of the mandible. The anterior and posterior belly of the digastric are also involved in the depression of the mandible and elevation of the hyoid bone and are therefore relevant to the masticatory system.

=== Ligaments ===
There are various ligaments associated with the TMJ and these limit and restrict border movements by acting as passive restraining devices. They do not contribute to joint function, rather exert a protective role. The key ligaments relevant to the TMJ are:

- The temporomandibular ligament
- The medial and lateral discal ligaments
- The sphenomandibular ligament
- The stylomandibular ligament

== Development of occlusion ==
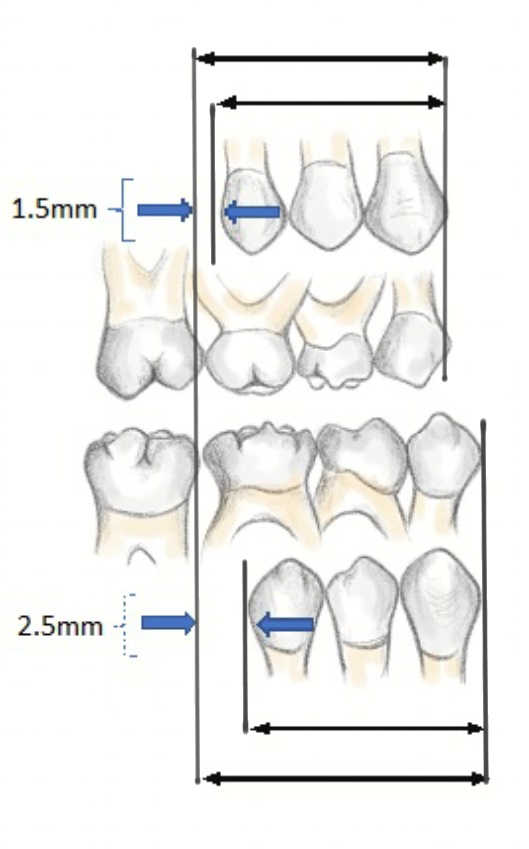
Leeway space is the size differential between the primary posterior teeth (C, D, E) and the permanent teeth (canine, first and second pre-molar). Maxillary space of 1.5mm, mandibular 2.5mm can be seen. (Institute of Dentistry, Aberdeen University)

As the primary (baby) teeth begin to erupt at 6 months of age, the maxillary and mandibular teeth aim to occlude with one another. The erupting teeth are moulded into position by the tongue, the cheeks and lips during development. Upper and lower primary teeth should be correctly occluding and aligned after 2 years whilst they are continuing to develop, with full root development complete at 3 years of age.

Around a year after development of the teeth is complete, the jaws continue to grow which results in spacing between some of the teeth (diastema). This effect is greatest in the anterior (front) teeth and can be seen from around age 4 – 5 years. This spacing is important as it allows space for the permanent (adult) teeth to erupt into the correct occlusion, and without this spacing there is likely to be crowding of the permanent dentition.

In order to fully understand the development of occlusion and malocclusion, it is important to understand the premolar dynamics in the mixed dentition stage. The mixed dentition stage is when both primary and permanent teeth are present. The permanent premolars erupt ~9–12 years of age, replacing the primary molars. The erupting premolars are smaller than the teeth they are replacing and this difference in space between the primary molars and their successors (1.5mm for maxillary, 2.5mm for mandibular) is termed Leeway Space. This allows the permanent molars to drift mesially into the spaces and develop a Class I occlusion.

== Incisor and molar classification ==
Classification of occlusion and malocclusion plays an important role in diagnosis and treatment planning in orthodontics. In order to describe the relationship of the maxillary molars to the mandibular molars, the Angle’s classification of malocclusion has commonly been used for many years. This system has also been adapted in an attempt to classify the relationship between the incisors of the two arches.

=== Incisor Relationship ===
When describing the relationship between maxillary and mandibular incisors, the following categories make up Angle's incisal relationship classification:

- Class I: Mandibular incisors contact the maxillary incisors in the middle third or on the cingulum of the palatal surface
- Class II: Mandibular incisors contact the maxillary incisors on the palatal surface, in the gingival third or posterior to the cingulum. This class may be further subdivided into division I and division II:
  - Division I includes maxillary incisors which are proclined (90%) and these individuals have a greater horizontal overlap - this is termed overjet
  - Division II includes those with retroclined (10%) incisors, which leads to an increase in vertical overlap - this is termed overbite
- Class III: Mandibular incisors occlude with the maxillary incisors on the palatal surface, in the incisal third specifically or anterior to the cingulum
  - In some cases the overjet is reversed (<0mm) and the mandibular incisors lie anterior to the maxillary incisors

=== Molar Relationship ===
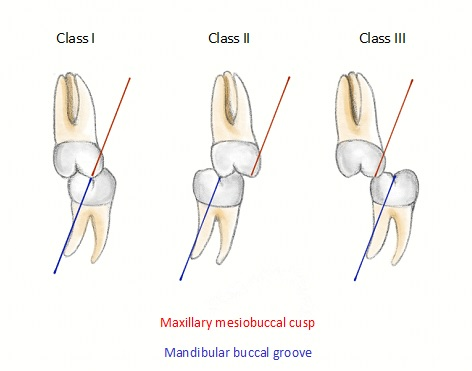
Molar relationship classification, observed when locating the mesial buccal cusp of the maxillary first molar and buccal groove of the mandibular first molar. (Institute of Dentistry, Aberdeen University)

When discussing the occlusion of the posterior teeth, the classification refers to the first molars and may be divided into three categories:

- Class I: The mandibular first molar occludes mesially to the maxillary first molar, with the mesiobuccal cusp of maxillary first molar occluding in the buccal groove of mandibular first molar
- Class II: The mesiobuccal cusp of the maxillary first molar occludes anterior to the buccal groove of the mandibular first molar
- Class III: If the mesiobuccal cusp of the maxillary first molar occludes posterior to the buccal groove of the mandibular first molar

Any deviation from the normal relation of teeth (Class I) is considered a malocclusion.

Class I relationships are thought to be “ideal”, however this classification does not take into consideration the positions of the two TMJ’s. Class II and III molar and incisor relationships are thought to be forms of malocclusion, however not all of these are severe enough to require orthodontic treatment. The Index of Orthodontic Treatment Need is a system that attempts to rank malocclusions in terms of significance of various occlusal traits and perceived aesthetic impairment. The index identifies those who would benefit most from orthodontic treatment and onward referral to an orthodontist.

== Occlusal terminology ==
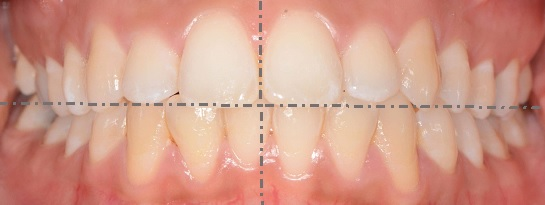
Intercuspal Position -The relationship between the mandible and the maxilla when the teeth are maximally meshed. It is the most cranial position of the mandible (Institute of Dentistry Aberdeen University)

Intercuspal Position (ICP), also known as Habitual Bite, Habitual Position or Bite of Convenience, is defined at the position where the maxillary and mandibular teeth fit together in maximum interdigitation. This position is usually the most easily recorded and is almost always the occlusion the patient closes into when they are asked to 'bite together'. This is the occlusion that the patient is accustomed to, hence sometimes termed the Habitual Bite.

Centric relation (CR) describes a reproducible jaw relationship (between the mandible and maxilla) and is independent of tooth contact. This is the position in which the mandibular condyles are located in the fossae in an antero-superior position against the posterior slope of the articular eminence. It is said that in CR, the muscles are in their most relaxed and least stressed state. This position is not influenced by muscle memory, but rather by the ligament which suspend the condyles within the fossa. Therefore it is the position that dentists use to create new occlusal relationships as for example, while making maxillary and mandibular complete dentures.

When the mandible is in this retruded position, it opens and closes on an arc of curvature around an imaginary axis drawn through the centre of the head of both condyles. This imaginary axis is termed the terminal hinge axis. The first tooth contact that occurs when the mandible closes in the terminal hinge axis position, is termed Retruded Contact Position (RCP). RCP can be reproduced within 0.08mm of accuracy due to the non-elastic TMJ capsule and restriction by the capsular ligaments, thus it can be considered a ‘border movement’ in Posselt’s envelope.

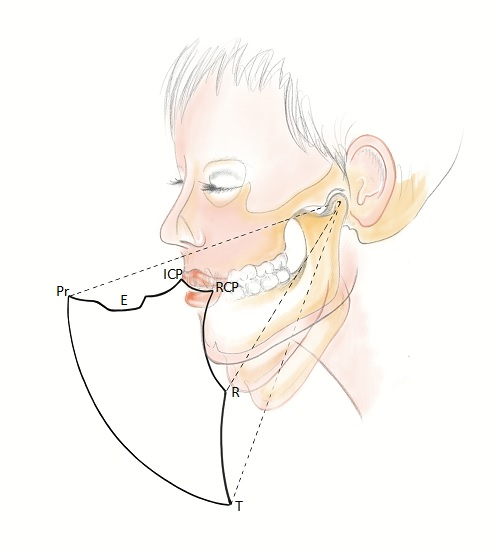
Posselt's Envelope of Border Movements - Pr - Maximum protrusion, E - Edge to edge position of the incisors, ICP/RCP - Condylar sliding movement represented clinically as tooth to tooth contact positions, R - Maximum mandibular opening condyles rotate but do not translate, T - Maximum mandibular opening with maximum translation of the condylar heads (Institute of Dentistry, University of Aberdeen)

Centric Occlusion (CO) is a confusing term, and is often incorrectly used synonymously with RCP. Both terms are used to define a position where the condyles are in CR, however RCP describes the initial tooth contact on closure, however this may be an interference contact. On the other hand, CO refers to the occlusion where the teeth are in maximum intercuspation in CR. Posselt (1952) determined that only in 10% of natural tooth and jaw relationships does ICP = CO (maximum intercuspation in CR) and so the term RCP is more appropriate when discussing the occlusion that occurs when the condyles are in their retruded position. CO is a term that is more relevant to complete denture application or where multiple fixed unit prosthodontics are provided, where the occlusion is arranged so that when the mandible is in CR, the teeth are interdigitating.

=== Posselt's Envelope of Border Movements ===
Posselt’s Envelope of Border Movement (often referred to as the 'border movements of the mandible') is a schematic diagram of the maximum jaw movement in three planes (sagittal, horizontal and frontal). This encompasses all movements away from RCP, and includes:

- Protrusive movements: When the mandible moves forward from centric relation, this is considered as protrusion. In Class I occlusion, the predominant contacts occur on the incisal and labial surfaces of the mandibular incisors and the incisal edges and palatal fossa areas of the maxillary incisors.
- Lateral movements: When the mandible moves to the left or right, the mandibular posterior teeth move laterally across the opposing teeth. For example, when the mandible moves to the right, the right mandibular teeth move laterally across their opponents and this is termed the working side of the mandible (the side towards which the mandible is moving). In contrast, the left mandibular teeth move medially, downwards and anteriorly across their opposing posteriors and this is called the non-working side (the side to which the mandible is moving away from).
- Retrusive movements: This is when the mandible moves posteriorly from ICP. Compared with protrusive and lateral movements, retrusive movements are generally considerably smaller with a range of movement around 1 or 2 mm due to restriction by the ligamentous structures.

== Guidance, natural teeth and function ==
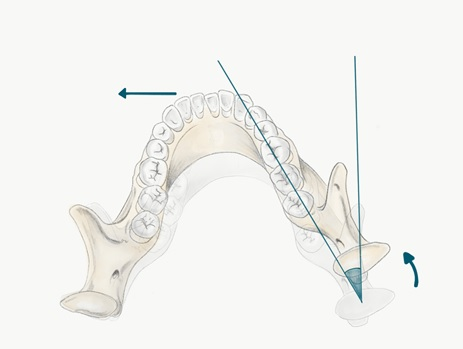
Bennet Angle - The TV (orbiting) condyle, as the mandible moves (progressive side shift). (Institute of Dentistry Aberdeen University)

Mandibular movements are guided by two different systems; the ‘posterior’ guidance system and the ‘anterior’ guidance system.

=== Posterior guidance system ===
Posterior guidance refers to TMJ articulations and associated structures. It is the condyles within the fossa and the associated muscles and ligaments together with its neuromuscular link that determines mandibular movements. Lateral, protrusive and repressive excursions of the mandible are guided by the posterior system.

Lateral excursions

It is important to define the movement of the condyles in lateral excursions:

- Working condyle: This is the condyle closest to the side which the mandible is moving (e.g. if the mandible moves laterally to the right, the right condyle is the working side condyle)

- Non-working condyle: This is the side to which the mandible is moving away from (e.g. if the mandible moves laterally to the right, the left condyle is the non-working side condyle)

- The maximum lateral movement of the mandible to the left or right side is approximately 10-12mm
- The primary movement in lateral excursions occurs on the non-working side (NWS) condyle (also called the balancing or orbiting condyle). The NWS condylar head moves in a downward, forward and medial direction. This movement is defined against two separate planes, the vertical and horizontal plane
  - Bennet Angle : the angle of medial movement on NWS condyle relative to the vertical plane
  - Condylar Angle : the angle of downwards movement of the NWS condyle relative to the horizontal plane
- The working side (WS) condyle (also called the rotating condyle) undergoes an immediate, non-progressive lateral shift. This movement is called the Bennet movement (however this may be confused with the Bennet Angle), so this is more commonly referred to as an Immediate Side Shift. The condyle is seen to rotate with a slight lateral shift in the direction of movement

Protrusive movements

- The condylar heads predominantly translate forwards and downwards along the distal face of the articular face in the glenoid fossa. Protrusive movements are restricted by the ligamentous structures to a maximum of ~8-11mm (depending on skull morphology and size of subject)

Retrusive movements

- As for retrusion, this movement is restricted by the ligamentous structures and the maximum retrusive limit is usually ~1mm however 2-3mm is rarely seen in some patients.

We can not influence the posterior guidance system through dental restorative treatment.

=== Anterior guidance system ===
Anterior guidance refers to the influence of contacting teeth on the paths of mandibular movements. The tooth contacts may be anterior, posterior tooth contacts or both - however termed anterior guidance as these contacts are still anterior to the TMJ. This can be further classified into:

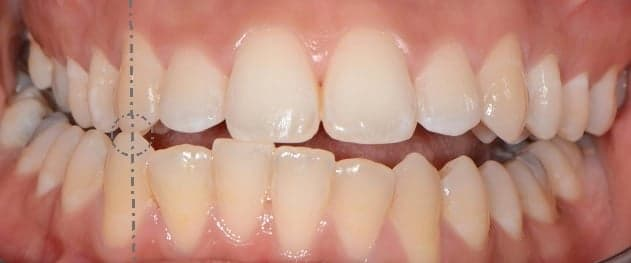
Canine guidance during right lateral excursions (Institute of Dentistry University of Aberdeen)

Canine Guidance

- Dynamic occlusion that occurs on the canines (on the working side) during lateral excursions of the mandible.
- These teeth are best suited to accept horizontal forces in eccentric movements due to their long roots and good crown/root ratio
- It is easy for the dental technicians during wax up and construction of restoration to provide this

Group Function

- Multiple contacts between the maxillary and mandibular teeth in lateral movements on the WS whereby simultaneous contact of several teeth acts as a group to distribute occlusal forces.
- It is preferable for this guidance to be as anterior as possible e.g. premolars rather than molars, as there is increased force applied when the contacts are closer to the TMJ.

Incisal Guidance

- The influence of the contacting surfaces of the mandibular and maxillary incisors on mandibular movements is characterised by the overbite and overjet of the maxillary incisors.

In restorative treatment, it is possible to manipulate and design anterior guidance systems that is in harmony with the masticatory system.

=== Clinical relevance of guidance ===
Tooth contact involved in guidance is particularly important as these occlude a vast number of times per day and so need to be able to resist both heavy and non-axial occlusal loads. When restoring the anterior guidance system should be compatible with the posterior guidance system. This means that excessive strain should not be applied on the posterior guidance system which is limited by the ligamemtous structures.

Upon restoration of the occlusal surfaces of teeth, it is likely to change the occlusion and therefore guidance systems. It is unlikely the TMJ will adapt to these changes in occlusion, but rather the teeth adapt to the new occlusion through tooth wear, tooth movement or fracture. For this reason, it is important to consider these guidance concepts when providing restorations. Guidance should also be considered before restorations as it should not be expected for a heavily restored tooth to provide guidance alone as this leaves the tooth vulnerable to fracture during function.

== Organisation of the occlusion ==
The arrangement of teeth in function is important and over the years three recognised concepts have been developed to describe how teeth should and should not contact:

1. Bilateral balanced occlusion
2. Unilateral balanced occlusion
3. Mutually protected occlusion

=== Bilateral balanced occlusion ===
This concept is based on the curve of Spee and curve of Wilson and is becoming outdated for the restored natural dentition. However, it still finds application in removable prosthodontics. This scheme involves contacts on as many teeth as possible (both on the working and non-working side) in all excursive movements of the mandible. This is especially important in the case of complete denture provision as contacting teeth on the NWS help stabilise the denture bases in mandibular movement. It was believed in the 1930s that this arrangement was ideal for the natural dentition when providing full occlusal reconstruction in order to distribute the stresses. However, it was found that the lateral forces placed on the restored posterior teeth produced damaging effects on the restorations.

=== Unilateral balanced occlusion ===
On the other hand, unilateral balanced occlusion is a widely used tooth arrangement that is used in current dentistry and is commonly known as group function. This concept is based on the observation that NWS contacts were destructive and therefore the teeth on the NWS should be free of any eccentric contacts, and instead the contacts should be distributed on the WS thus sharing the occlusal load. Group function is used when canine guidance cannot be achieved and also in the Pankey-Mann Schuyler (PMS) approach where it was deemed better than canine guidance as it distributed the loading on the WS better.

=== Mutually protected occlusion ===
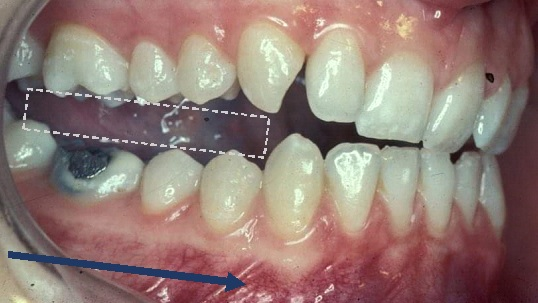
Mutually protected occlusion - Posterior disocclusion of teeth as the mandible is protruded (Institute of Dentistry Aberdeen University)

The Journal of Prosthetic Dentistry (2017) defines mutually protected occlusion as ‘an occlusal scheme in which the posterior teeth prevent excessive contact of the anterior teeth in maximal intercuspal position, and the anterior teeth disengage the posterior teeth in all mandibular excursive movements’

In eccentric movements, damaging forces are applied to the posterior teeth and the anteriors are best suited to receiving these. Therefore during protrusive movements, the contact or guidance of the anteriors should be adequate to disocclude and protect the posterior teeth.

In contrast, the posterior teeth are more suited to accept the forces that are applied during closure of the mandible. This is because the posteriors are positioned so the forces are applied directly along the long axis of the tooth and are able to dissipate them efficiently whereas the anteriors cannot accept these heavy forces as well due to their labial positioning and angulation. It is therefore accepted that the posterior teeth should have heavier contacts than the anteriors in ICP and act as a stop for vertical closure.

Additionally, in lateral excursions either canine or group function should act to disclude the posterior teeth on the WS because, as described above, the anterior teeth are best suited to dissipate damaging horizontal forces, as well as the contact being further away from the TMJ, so the forces created are decreased in strength. Group function or canine guidance should also provide disocclusion of the teeth on the NWS as the amount and direction of force applied to the TMJ and teeth can be destructive due to an increase in muscle activity. An absence of NWS contacts also allows smooth movement of the working side condyle as a contact may disengage the guidance of the condyle and therefore cause an unstable mandibular relationship.

== Deflective contacts and interferences ==
A deflective contact is a contact that diverts the mandible from its intended movement. An example of this is when the mandible is deflected into ICP by the RCP-ICP slide, which path is determined by the deflective tooth contacts. This is often involved in function (e.g. chewing), however in some cases these deflective contacts can be damaging and may lead to pain around the tooth (often associated with bruxism). However, some patients may be totally unaware of similar deflective contacts suggesting that it is the patient's adaptability rather than the contact that may influence the patient's presentation.

An occlusal interference is any tooth contact that prevents, or hinders harmonious mandibular movement (an undesirable tooth contact).

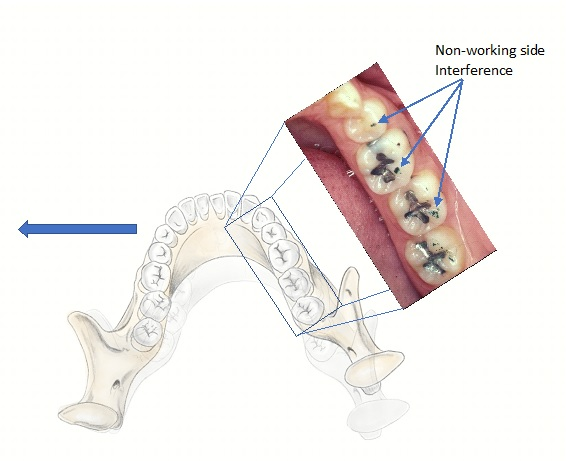
Non-working side interference (photograph) detectable with articulating paper or plastic shimstock, as the mandible moves to the left (working side). (Institute of Dentistry Aberdeen University)

The occlusal interferences may be classified as follows:

1. Working Side Interference: When there is a heavy or early tooth contact between the maxillary and mandibular teeth on the side that the mandible is moving towards, and this contact may or may not discludes the anteriors.
2. Non-Working Side Interference: An occlusal contact on the side the mandible is moving away from that prevents harmonious movement of the mandible. These have the potential to be more destructive in comparison to WS interferences due to the obliquely directed forces.
3. Protrusive Interference: Contacts that occur between the distal aspects of the maxillary posterior teeth and the mesial aspect of the mandibular posterior teeth. These interferences are potentially very damaging and may even cause an inability to incise properly due to the close proximity of the interference to the muscle.

When the dentist is providing restorations, it is important that these do not create an interference, otherwise the restoration will receive increased loading. As for deflective contacts, interferences may also be associated with parafunction such as bruxism (although evidence is weak) and may adversely affect the distribution of heavy occlusal forces. Interferences may also cause pain in the masticatory muscles due to altering their activity, however there is large controversy and debate as to whether there is a relationship between occlusion and temporomandibular disorders. Almost all dentate individuals have occlusal interferences, and therefore they are not seen to be an etiology of all TMDs. When there is an acute change or significant instability in the occlusal condition and subsequently represents an etiological factor for a TMD, occlusal treatment is required.

Occlusal adjustment (removal of occlusal interferences) may be carried out in order to obtain a stable occlusal relationship and is achieved by selectively grinding the occlusal interferences or through wear of a hard occlusal splint to ensure true retruded relationship is established.

== 'Ideal' occlusion ==
When there is an absence of symptoms and the masticatory system is functioning efficiently, the occlusion is considered normal or physiological. It is understood that no such ‘ideal’ occlusion exists for everyone, but rather each individual has their own 'ideal occlusion'. This is not focused on any specific occlusal configuration but rather occurs when the person’s occlusion is in harmony with the rest of the stomatognathic system (TMJ, teeth and supporting structures, and the neuromuscular elements).

However, an optimal functional occlusion is important to consider when providing restorations as this helps to understand what is trying to be achieved. It is defined in established texts as:

1. Centric occlusion and centric relation being in harmony (CO=CR)

- There should be even and simultaneous contacts of all posterior teeth when the mouth is closed and the condyles are lying in their most superior and anterior position, resting against the posterior slope of the articular eminence (CR)
- Note that the anterior teeth should also be occluding, but the contact should be lighter than the posterior contacts

2. Freedom in CO

- This means the mandible is still able to move slightly in the sagittal and horizontal plane in centric occlusion
- This is also part of the PMS theory of occlusion mentioned earlier in organisation of occlusion.

3. Immediate and lasting posterior disocclusion upon mandibular movement

- During lateral excursive movements, the working side contacts act to disclude the non-working side immediately
- During protrusive movements, the anterior tooth contact and guidance acts to disclude the posterior teeth immediately

4. Canine guidance is considered the best anterior guidance system

- This is due to their ability to accept horizontal forces as they have the longest and largest roots as well as a desirable crown/root ratio
- They are also surrounded by dense compact bone unlike the posterior teeth which makes them more suited to tolerate horizontal forces
- Canine guidance is also easier to manage restoratively than group function
- However, if the patient’s canines are not positioned correctly for canine guidance, group function (involving the canines and premolars) is the most favourable alternative

It is necessary to understand the concepts that influence the function and health of the masticatory system in order to prevent, minimise or eliminate any breakdown or trauma to the TMJs or teeth.

== Patient adaptability ==
There are various factors that play a role in the adaptive capability of a patient with regards to changes in occlusion. Factors such as the central nervous system and the mechanoreceptors in the periodontium, mucosa and dentition are all of importance here. It is in fact, the somatosensory input from these sources that determines whether an individual is able to adapt to changes in the occlusion, opposed to the occlusal scheme itself. Failure of adaptation to minor changes in the occlusion can occur, although rare. It is thought that patients who are increasingly vigilant to any changes in the oral environment are less likely to adapt to any occlusal changes. Psychological and emotional stress can also contribute to the patient's ability to adapt as these factors have an impact on the central nervous system.

== Occlusal examination ==
In individuals with unexplained pain, fracture, drifting, mobility and tooth wear, a full occlusal examination is vital. Similarly when complex restorative work is planned it is also essential to identify whether any occlusal changes are required prior to the provision of definitive restoration In some people even minor discrepancies in the occlusion can lead to symptoms involving the TMJ or acute orofacial pain so it is important to identify and eradicate this cause.

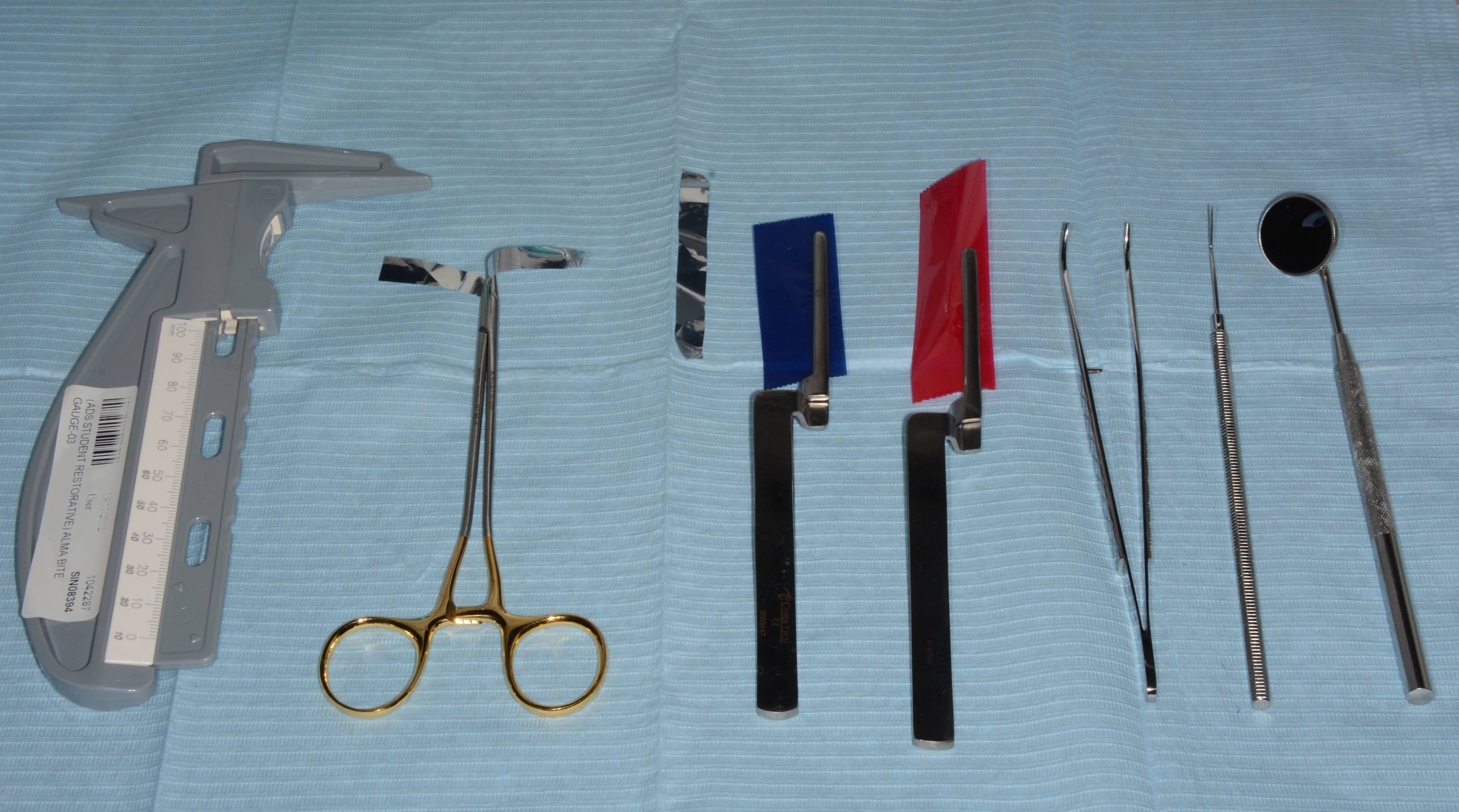
Occlusal Examination Instruments: Willis gauge, Mosquito forceps with Shim stock, Miller's forceps with thin blue and red articulating paper, College tweezers, Dental probe. Dental mirror (From left to right) by University of Aberdeen.

Instruments Required

- Miller’s forceps
- Articulating paper
- Shimstock
- Mosquito forceps
- Mirror
- Dental probe
- Willis gauge

The examination should be carried out using a systematic approach whilst assessing the following:

- Facial appearance
- Musculature
- TMJ
- Each arch individually
- Intercuspal Position (ICP)
- Retruded Contact Position (RCP)
- RCP-ICP slide
- Lateral excursions
- Protrusion
- OVD

=== Extra-oral examination ===
1) Facial Appearance

The facial symmetry of the patient should be observed.

The skeletal relationship of the patient should then be identified and noted.

- Class I: The maxilla and mandible are in harmony and coincide
- Class II: The maxilla lies anterior to the mandible and is retrognathic
- Class III: The maxilla lies posterior to the mandible and is prognathic

The facial height of the patient should be considered and it should be noted where there may have been a loss.

2) Muscles

Begin by simply palpating the muscles concerned with the occlusion of the teeth. These muscles include the muscles of mastication and other muscles within the head and neck area, such as the supra-hyoid muscles. It is best to palpate the muscles simultaneously and bilaterally. The temporalis, masseter, medial and lateral pterygoids, geniohyoid, mylohyoid and digastric muscles alongside the trapezius, posterior cervical muscles, occipitalis muscle and the sternocleidomastoid should all be checked for any signs of wasting or tenderness. Temporomandibular dysfunction commonly presents with muscular tenderness, but pain or palpable soreness associated with the muscles can also be linked to parafunctional activity.

3) TMJ

TMJ disorders can be detected through occlusal examination. Ask the patient to open and close whilst placing two fingers over the space of the TMJ. Opening of less than 35mm in the mandible is considered to be restricted and such restriction may be associated with intra-capsular changes within the joint. Following this, ask the patient to move their jaw to the right and following this, to the left. Note any clicking, crepitus, pain or deviation.

=== Intra-oral examination ===
4) Maxillary / Mandibular Arch

Assess each arch and identify whether there are any signs of occlusal disharmony, overloading, tooth migration, wear, craze lines, cracking or mobility (not due to periodontal causes). Abfraction, faceting and possible vertical enamel fracture lesions should also be noted if present.

5) Contacts in ICP

Begin by assessing the incisor and molar relationship as described above. Similarly examine the overbite and overjet. An overbite of 3-5mm and an overjet of 2-3mms are considered to be within the range of normal.

To look at the ICP, articulating paper should be placed on the occlusal surface and the patient asked to bite together, which will mark their occlusal contacts. It is best to check these whilst the teeth are dry.

- During ICP, most opposing teeth should be contacting
- Close examination of these contacts marked by the articulating paper help to identify the nature of the tooth contacts
- Good stable contacts often appear as small and not very prominent markings when articulating paper is used and there are multiple contacts on each tooth
- Broad and rubbing contacts identified in ICP may be associated with disturbances in function and may indicate occlusal instability
- These contacts can be verified using Shimstock (a 12.5μm thick mylar strip) and the stability of the contacts can be checked
- The operator should pull the Shimstock through the teeth, whilst the patient is biting together
- This should be carried out for each set of teeth and will highlight if there is adequate contact to hold the Shimstock
- This material is appropriate as it is thinner and will eliminate any false contacts that may occur with even thin articulating papers that are roughly 20μm thick
- One is also able to pull shim stock through when patients are biting together unlike other articulating paper, which will tear

6) RCP

The patient may be guided into CR using one of the follow methods;

- Bimanual manipulation- manipulating the patient's condyles so they are in CR
- The operator should lightly rest their fingers along the inferior border of the mandible and their thumbs should lie lightly on the anterior aspect of the chin
- When the patient is relaxed place light downward pressure on the chin and light upward pressure under the angle of the mandible
- Deprogramme the jaw by guiding the opening and closing of the jaw and once the patient is relaxed, ask them to close gently and stop when they feel teeth first contacting
- Chin point guidance- one hand is used to apply pressure to the chin guiding the chin posteriorly with some force

In some patients it may be difficult to guide the mandible into CR, for example in those with muscle tension, muscle splinting, occlusal disharmony or parafunctional habit. For these patients a Lucia Jig or deprogramming appliance can be constructed at chair-side.

Mark RCP tooth contacts using articulating paper, note the teeth which are contacting and identify whether this RCP position is causing problems related to the occlusion. For example if there is a heavy contact or interference in RCP this may be the cause of occlusal disturbance. It is important to be able to guide the patient into RCP, as a registration may need to be taken in this position particularly if the occlusion is being reorganised, the OVD is being changed or even just for diagnostic and treatment planning purposes.

7) RCP-ICP Slide

The patient should be supine and relaxed. They should be placed into RCP by the operator and then asked to bite together “normally”, this is moving them from RCP into their position of maximum intercuspation (ICP). Ask the patient to feel the slide and identify whether this is small or large. The slide should be smooth and the direction should be recorded. The operator should evaluate from both the side of the patient and the front of the patient, how far the mandible travels both forward and laterally (however this is difficult and it may be easier to observe by mounting casts onto an articulator). This can be done by observing the maxillary and mandibular incisors during the slide. The RCP-ICP slide for most dentate patients tends to be roughly 1–2 mm in an anterior and upward direction. A deflective RCP-ICP slide, can have some relation to an anterior thrust. An anterior thrust, which is likely to be associated with the anterior teeth or other teeth involved in guidance such as canine teeth, often causes the teeth to exhibit fremitus.

8) Protrusive Movements

The patient is asked to move their mandible forward from ICP. This is commonly around a distance of 8-10mm and would normally be until the lower incisors slide anterior to the incisal edges of the maxillary anteriors. Observe the contacts during this movement. Mark the contacts using coloured articulating paper alongside the ICP contacts, which should be in a different colour - any teeth providing guidance and any interferences should be noted.

9) Lateral Excursions

The patient is also asked to move their lower jaw to one side. Lateral movements should be measured and measurements of 12mm are thought to be normal. Both working side and non-working side should be observed during this movement. Record any teeth that are providing guidance during this movement and any interferences that are present (and the location of these). Smooth and unbroken contacts should be identified when these excursive movements are recorded

10) OVD

If occlusal wear can be seen, a Willis gauge is used to measure the occlusal-vertical dimension and the resting vertical dimension of an individual.

Take a measurement by placing two reference points on the patients face, one under the nose (usually the columella) and one under the chin. Take one measurement whilst the patient is resting (teeth should not be contacting) and one with the patient biting together i.e. in ICP and take this measurement away from the resting measurement to give the freeway space. The normal freeway space is usually 2-4mm.

Patients with considerable tooth wear may have lost occlusal vertical dimension (OVD). When restoring the dentition, it is important to be aware of the exact OVD the patient has and by how much you may be increasing this. Patient’s may not be able to adapt to a large increase in OVD and therefore this may have to be done in phases.

=== Summary ===
Table 1: Summary of key aspects of occlusal examination
Aspect of Examination	What to look for
Facial appearance	This involves assessing the face for symmetry and categorising the patient into the appropriate skeletal relationship.
Musculature	Palpate and ensure normal muscle mass with no signs of wasting.
Temporomandibular Joint	Any pain, clicking, crepitus or deviation should be noted and appropriate questions asked to find out more.
Maxillary and Mandibular Arch	Examine each arch individually and note any signs of occlusal loading, faceting and microfractures within the teeth.
Intercuspal Position (ICP)	Note overbite and overjet. Assess where the teeth contact in ICP and whether these contacts are stable or not.
Retruded Contact Position (RCP)	Put the patient into their RCP using bimanual manipulation, or chin point guidance. Assess their RCP and if any problems in relation to the occlusion exist note these.
RCP-ICP Slide	Assess both the quality and the quantity of the slide. The slide from RCP to ICP should be smooth and is usually about 1–2 mm in length, this should be confirmed during examination and any issues recorded.
Protrusive Movement	Any teeth providing guidance should be noted. Similarly any interferences should be made note of.
Right Lateral Excursion	It is important to examine which teeth the guidance is on and to note any interferences that can be identified on both working and non-working sides.
Left Lateral Excursion	It is important to examine which teeth the guidance is on and to note any interferences that can be identified on both working and non-working sides.
Occlusal-vertical Dimension	Where necessary, measure the OVD i.e. in cases where there has been a loss of OVD or where interocclusal space is required or aesthetics are poor.

== Clinical applications of occlusion ==
Occlusion is a fundamental concept in dentistry yet it is commonly overlooked as it's perceived as being not important or too difficult to teach and understand. Clinicians should have a sound understanding of the principles regarding occlusal harmony in order to be able to recognise and treat common problems associated with occlusal disharmony. Some of the advantages associated with a working knowledge of these include:

- Improved patient comfort: for example, some people experience pain or sensitivity after the placement of a new restoration due to occlusal overload or an interference which possibly could be avoided should the practitioner consider these at time of placement
- Increased occlusal stability: teeth are less likely to drift, occlusal contacts are likely to be maintained etc.
- Increased success of restorations: excessive wear, fractures, cracks are less commonly observed where there is an ideal occlusion
- Better aesthetics: when the anterior teeth conform to ideal occlusal function and stability, the best aesthetic result is achieved

=== Simple occlusal adjustment ===
Involves simply grinding down involved cusps or restorations and may be indicated after careful examination when:

- Overloading of occlusal forces has resulted in pain, tooth fracture or mobility
- Interocclusal space is required for restoration provision (e.g. in the case of an overerupted tooth where occlusal plane corrections required)

=== Complex occlusal adjustment or reorganisation ===
May be required in more severe circumstances and some examples of these include:

- Elimination of an anterior thrust causing pain, wear, drifting or mobility
- To provide space for anterior restorations
- Management of bruxism (however, uncommon)
- The elimination of a temporomandibular joint disorder (however, as previously mentioned, occlusion is rarely an aetiological factor for TMD so there should be significant evidence to support this before alteration of the occlusion is pursued)

Achieving a satisfactory occlusal reorganisation involves choosing a desired jaw relationship (either conforming to existing ICP or producing a new ICP coincident with CR), deciding on the intercuspal contacts (removing deflective contacts and adjusting shapes/inclines of teeth), adjusting excursive contacts (removing interferences) and aiming for a mutually protected occlusion. This is an extremely complex process and entails a clinical occlusal examination as described above, along with detailed examination of mounted study casts and diagnostic wax-ups.

=== Mounted study casts ===
It is common practice to mount mandibular and maxillary casts (impressions are made of the teeth and poured in dental stone) in an articulator in ICP when constructing restorations that conform to the patient's existing occlusion. Casts mounted on an articulator in ICP are useful for diagnostic purposes or simple restorations, but where more extensive treatment is planned it is necessary to consider occlusal contacts relative to CR e.g. RCP -> ICP slide. Other situations a CR registration may be more appropriate than ICP include where there are plans to reorganise or adjust the existing occlusion (including changes to the occlusal vertical dimension). In these circumstances, in order to accurately stimulate mandibular movement around CR (particularly opening and closing of the mouth), using a facebow transfer, the maxillary cast should be mounted in a semi-adjustable articulator and then the mandibular cast should be mounted using a CR registration. The patient's new occlusion is then arranged so that the new ICP occurs when patient is in CR.

=== Diagnostic wax-ups ===
Wax-ups are indicated where changes to the occlusion or aesthetics are planned. Diagnostic wax-ups are when changes are made to the shapes of the teeth by methodically adding wax to the articulated stone casts representing the patient's teeth. This can be done in order to demonstrate to the patient what the planned restorations will look like, but can also be invaluable when simulating different occlusal schemes, studying the functional occlusion as well as providing temporary coverage whilst the restoration is being constructed by the lab through use of a matrix. Once an established plan has been constructed using the wax-ups, these can be used as a tool to guide the desired outcome in the mouth and provide a useful communication tool with both the dental laboratory and the patient.

== See also ==
- Malocclusion
- Maximum intercuspation
- Mutually protected occlusion
- Occlusal trauma
