= Height of curvature =

Measurement of the shape of a tooth

Height of curvature in the tooth can be defined as the line encircling a tooth at its greatest bulge to a selected path of insertion. The height of curvature is the same as the height of contour.

== Significance ==
The buccal and lingual contours of a tooth are important in determining the angle at which food is deflected from a tooth surface. If food is deflected too much, some of the gingiva would not have the right amount of stimulation. On the other hand, if food is deflected too little, some of it would be forced into the space which separates the tooth from the gingiva. Consequences of this could be inflammation of the gingiva or periodontal disease.

In young people the buccal and lingual curvatures lie below the gum as the teeth have not fully erupted. However, as tooth eruption progresses, the curvature is easier to see.

The shape of the crown of a tooth helps to prevent periodontal disease. It does this by allowing food to be deflected onto the gums at a specific angle so that the gum tissue can be stimulated and cleaned. Each tooth is shaped so that food is directed off the tooth and onto the gums instead. The shape of the tooth is also designed specifically for its function and to allow for its self-cleaning ability.

The proximal contact areas formed mesially and distally by the height of contour are important in maintaining tooth position and stability, preventing rotation and drift.

== Locations of height of curvature ==
For the outer (facial) surfaces of all teeth, the height of curvature is located in the cervical third of the teeth. In the inner (lingual) surfaces of anterior teeth, both upper and lower, the height of curvature is also located in the cervical third of the tooth, on the cingulum. In the posterior teeth, both in upper and lower jaw, the lingual height of contour is found at the middle third of the inner surface of the tooth. The lower second premolar proposes an exception as its height of curvature in inner surface is located in the occlusal third of the inner surface. In addition, the curvature of CEJ is more pronounced on the interproximal aspect than the buccal aspect of tooth. Therefore the measurement of CAL becomes compromised on the interproximal aspect.

== Functions ==
The height of contours have great functions to oral cavity

1. They allow the food to be deflected allowing proper degree of massage to the gingiva
2. They prevent the food of being accumulated at the tooth
3. Holding the gingiva under definite tension
4. Protection of the gingiva surrounding the tooth
5. Formation of a contact point between teeth, where the mesial and distal surfaces of adjacent teeth meet

The height of contour must be replicated in restorative dental work to serve the functions that a natural contour would provide.

== Mal-developed height of curvature ==
In case of under-developed curvature, gingival recession may result. In case of overdeveloped curvature, food will accumulate and there will be no massage to the gingiva and chronic inflammation may result.
