= Posselt's envelope of motion =

Range of movement of the mandible

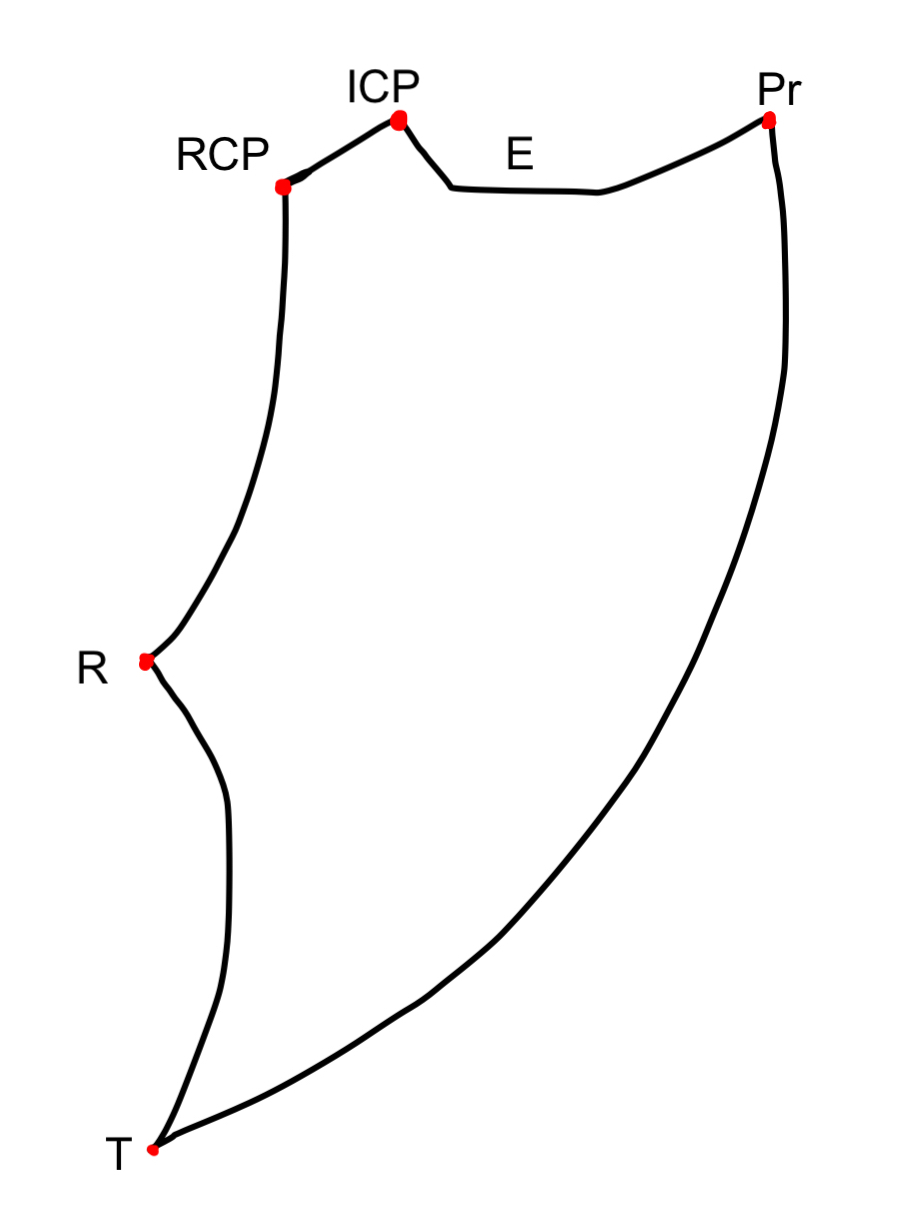
- A sagittal view of all the movement possible by the mandibular incisors. As a whole, this model is known as Posselt's envelope of motion.
- Specialty: Dental

Posselt's envelope of motion or Posselt's envelope of movement refers to the range of motion of the lower jaw bone, or mandible.

This envelope was first described by Ulf Posselt in 1952. It is a diagrammatic representation of a sagittal view of maximum mandibular movement. Posselt postulated that in the first 20mm of opening and closing, the mandible only rotates and does not simultaneously move downward and forward.

== History ==
Posselt's envelope of motion is named after Dr. Ulf Posselt from the Karolinska Institute, the Institute of Anatomy of the University of Lund and the Roentgen-Diagnostic Department of the State Dental School, Malmö.

In 1952, Posselt carried out some investigations on 65 dental students between the age of 20–29, in an attempt to examine the capacity of the mandible for movement in the occlusal and sagittal planes. Since the mandible can go through a vast number of different movement paths, Posselt decided to start by studying the "border movements", a term he uses to denote the mandible's capacity for movement. Then he compared these with the habitual movements of the mandible.

From the investigation, he concluded that:

1. habitual movements do not generally coincide with border movements,
2. habitual movements show considerably greater variability in individuals than border movements,
3. the rest positions and intercuspal position generally differ from the retruded position of the mandible.

Posselt's other findings from the study can be briefly summarised as follows:

The movement area of the mandible in the sagittal and horizontal planes is characteristic of the individual but varies in different persons. However, the border movement paths are reproducible in the same individual. It is suggested that the temporomandibular joints (TMJ) limit the border movements of the mandible.

In 1957, he used a gnatho-thesiometer to analyse the areas of movement for three points on the mandible in three main planes. Five experimental subjects with practically all their teeth present had their mandibular movements analysed. The shape, dimensions and variations in the subjects were described and illustrated with drawings, and 3D models were constructed on the basis of the measurements made.

== Anatomy of TMJ in relation to Posselt's envelope ==
Intercuspal position (ICP), also known as centric occlusion, is a position in which teeth occlusion plays an important role. In the majority of population, centric occlusion is said to be averagely 1 mm anterior to centric relation in the natural dentition. Intermediate zone of the articular disk lies in between condyle and eminence posterior slope, with posterior band lying above condyle.

Retruded Centric Position or the other term called Centric Relation is when the condyles are located in the uppermost position in mandibular fossa, anterior to distal slope of articular eminence. On top of that, condyles being at terminal hinge position.

Rotational. During the opening of mandible, rotation is the movement at the start of its movement, this occurs in the lower temporomandibular joint compartment. As mandible is being depressed, condyle is tightly bounded to the articular disc by medial and collateral ligaments, hence only allowing rotational movements.

Translation Translation occurs in the upper TMJ compartment and provides most of the mandible's ability to open. Articular disc and condyle complex slide inferiorly on the articular eminences, allowing maximum depression of the mandible.

Maximal Mandibular Opening (T). Condylar heads are said to be at a maximum anterior-inferior position. Maximum Protrusion. This position is where condyles are in the most anterior position, and is determined by stylomandibular ligaments partly.

== Border movements and positions ==
=== ICP ===
Intercuspal position (ICP), also known as centric occlusion, describes the position of "best fit" between the upper and lower teeth. It is the closest relationship of the mandible to the maxilla as this is where all the teeth fully interlock simultaneously. Therefore, it is a position that is determined by the teeth and to some extent the soft tissues as well. The tongue, cheeks and lips contribute to the development of ICP by guiding the eruption of the upper and lower teeth and stabilising their positions. Though it may seem automatic that an individual goes from a rest position to ICP, this path of closure is actually a learnt behaviour that is conditioned into short term memory.

ICP is a position used by the mandible at the end of a chewing cycle. This position is also used a hundred times a day in function specifically to stabilise the mandible during swallowing. When we swallow, a majority of us will form an anterior oral seal which is when the teeth are in ICP and the lips closed together. However, there is a small number of people who are unable to do that and swallow with their teeth apart instead. The reasons for this could be that there is a discrepancy in the jaw(s), a malposition of the teeth or a deformity in the soft tissues.

ICP is also a term that is commonly encountered amongst dentists as it is used as a reference point when making fillings. Restorations in general are adjusted in ICP and dentists usually ask patients to "bite together with their back teeth". However, this may not be achievable in all cases as not everyone's occlusion in ICP is stable. One of the factors that complicate restorative work is over-eruption of teeth as there is now a reduced height between the upper and lower arch. The prosthesis won't be able to seat fully and the patient will appear to have a premature bite or appear 'high' in ICP. Other features that result in an unstable ICP are:

- Drifting of teeth
- Tilting of teeth
- Teeth extracted or lost due to other causes
- Loss of tooth contour (due to carious decay, tooth wear or tooth fracture)

=== RCP ===
Retruded contact position (RCP) also known as centric relation, describes the relationship of the mandible to maxilla when the mandibular condyles are in their most superior and anterior position, independent of tooth contact.

According to the latest definition by The Glossary of Prosthodontic Terms, RCP is defined as "The maxillomandibular relationship in which the condyles articulate with the thinnest avascular portion of their respective discs, with the complex in the anterior-superior position against the slopes of the articular eminences. This position is independent of tooth contact. It is restricted to a purely rotary movement about the transverse horizontal axis."

RCP is said to be a relatively reproducible position. Posselt in his "Studies in the Mobility of the Human Mandible" found that the RCP is reproducible to 0.08mm. The reproducibility of this position is achieved by the non-elastic nature of the temporomandibular joint capsule and the associated capsular ligaments. Due to the reproducibility, RCP is widely used in the management of dentate and edentulous patients and as a reference point for registration for mounting casts onto articulator.

=== Rotational ===
In the temporomandibular joint, the initial mouth opening occur by rotation, within the inferior cavity of the joint. The TMJ rotates around a fixed axis within the condyle, with no antero-inferior translation. The maximum jaw opening with this rotation movement is indicated as 'R' on the Posselt's envelope of motion.

=== Translation ===
When the jaw is opened widely, it exceeds the maximum range of jaw opening with rotational movement, and a secondary gliding movement occurs. This movement is called translation. Translation occurs within the superior cavity of the joint. During translation, the condylar heads slide anterior and inferiorly down the articular eminence, allowing the jaw to open wider. This path of movement is the line produced between 'R' and 'T', where 'T' indicate the maximal jaw opening with full translational movement.

=== Edge to edge ===
Edge-to-edge articulation is when opposing front teeth meet along their incisal edges when teeth are in maximal intercuspal position. In Posselt's envelope this happens in ICP as the incisors of the mandible slide past the cingulum of the upper incisors to meet the biting edge and continue to maintain tooth contact as mandible protrudes forward.

=== Maximum protrusion ===
When the lower jaw is pushed anteriorly as far as possible with some teeth in contact, it is said to be maximum protrusion. In Posselt's border movement diagram, maximum protrusion is the most anterior based on the sagittal view. Condyles are in the most anterior position and determined partly by stylomandibular ligaments. The protrusive jaw movement is a forward jaw movement described as a sliding movement through the tooth contacts, focusing solely on translating movement of the jaw forward, also with translating movement downwards.
