= Mutually protected occlusion =

- Other names: Canine-protected occlusion, Organic occlusion
- Specialty: Prosthodontics, Restorative dentistry, Occlusion
- Complications: Abfraction, Attrition (dentistry)
- Treatment: Occlusal adjustment, Prosthodontic rehabilitation
- Prognosis: Excellent with stable posterior support and healthy canines

In dentistry, a mutually protected occlusion is an occlusal scheme in which the anterior teeth protect the posterior teeth, and vice versa.

The anterior teeth protect the posterior teeth by providing for a plane of guidance during excursions, thus allowing the cusps of the posterior teeth to disclude rather than strike one another during lateral or protrusive movements from centric relation. In other words, the posterior teeth have much larger crowns and more cusps than the anterior teeth. Because posterior crowns are wider and possess cuspal projections in various configurations, the cusps of the maxillary teeth and those of the mandibular teeth have an opportunity to bang into each other during chewing, speech or simply meeting together when one bites down. To prevent this from happening, the anterior teeth of each arch will, ideally, be situated so as to come into contact before the cusps of the posterior teeth do, thus preventing wear on the posterior teeth. This requires less force because the anterior teeth are further from the joint (analogous to stopping a door further from its hinge).

The posterior teeth protect the anterior teeth by providing a stable vertical dimension of occlusion. While anterior teeth may retain their natural position even after loss of posterior teeth, the masticatory forces will eventually cause the single-rooted anterior to splay, thus leading to a collapsed bite.
