= Phum Sophy =

Archaeological site in Cambodia

Phum Sophy is a mid-late Iron Age archaeological site discovered in the O’Chroc District, Banteay Meanchey Province, Northwest Cambodia. The site was excavated over two field seasons in 2009 and 2010 by primary excavators Dougald O’Reilly of the Australian National University and Louise Shewan of The University of Melbourne. This excavation was part of the ‘History in their Bones: A diachronic, bio-archaeological study of diet, mobility and social organisation in Cambodia’ funded project by the Australian Research Council.

== Discovery ==
The site was first excavated in 2009 after reports of looting unearthed evidence of a prehistoric settlement. After consultation with local authorities, excavations on the north-east side of the site began with a 3m x 5m unit, with a 1m x 2m extension. In the following 2010 field season excavations continued with a 5m x 3m trench within the village mound.

== Chronology ==
Radiocarbon dating has identified Phum Sophy as ranging from the first to the seventh centuries CE, which correlates to the mid to late Iron Age. The burials found at the site all share the same funerary rituals, thus suggesting that the finds are all from the same mortuary phase. Several nearby pre-Angkorian temples implies continued occupation in the area, however the excavated cemetery is limited to its prehistoric context. The abandonment of the cemetery in the 7th Century aligns with the greater trend of Cambodian and North-eastern Thai relocation to rectilinear sites.

== Human Remains ==
The skeletal remains of 20 individuals were uncovered across both the 2009 and 2010 excavations at Phum Sophy. The age, sex and stature of the individuals have been ascertained by the osteological analyses of Domett and Newton. 12 adults and 8 sub-adults comprised the assemblage, however the sex could be determined for only 7 of the individuals. Due to the looting that occurred at the site prior to excavations, the contexts of the human remains were often poor and disturbed. This improved in the second excavation of 2010, as the excavation at the centre of the village was typically wealthier and less disturbed.

== Results ==
=== Economy ===
The finds of both the 2009 and 2010 excavations afford an insight into the economy of north-west Cambodia around 2000 years ago. From the analyses already conducted, it is possible to conclude that Phum Sophy was an agrarian village that participated in metallurgy, textile production and potential ceramic production. There is also evidence to suggest that these vocations contributed to regional trading networks.

=== Agriculture ===
The further inclusion of farming implements in burial assemblages validates the conclusion that the economy was also agricultural. Sickles, knives and hafted digging tools were both included in the internments and distributed throughout the stratigraphy. The faunal remains of the site further indicate a broad spectrum of resources were enjoyed by the inhabitants of the site.

=== Metallurgy ===
Both the mortuary contexts and general spits of the site suggest the practice of metallurgy in Phum Sophy. Excavations at the site unearthed digging and harvesting tools, weaponry, iron and bronze jewellery, bronze bells and bronze vessel fragments, although no moulds or smithing equipment were found within the site. There is therefore ongoing discussion as to whether metallurgy was practiced within the village itself or made available through participation in trade networks.

=== Textile Production ===
The presence of spindle whorls indicates that textile production was practiced by the inhabitants of Phum Sophy. Seventeen whorls were found in various burial assemblages across the site, all of which shared a similar shape, weight, composition and decoration, thus indicating local production. The spindle whorl assemblage at this site is unique in South-East Asian contexts, which combined with its high standardisation have led archaeologists to suggest that the re was a larger market supply for spindle whorls.

=== Dental Health ===
Analysis of the dental health of the skeletal remains found at Phum Sophy have provided insight into the health of the inhabitants of the village. Strong evidence for cultural modification has been found at Sophy, with nearly 50% of samples showing evidence of intentional antemortem removal of anterior teeth. Other individuals from the site show evidence of teeth removed antemortem or sharpened, and all dental modification at Sophy is limited to the canines. The ablation and filing of teeth cannot be strongly aligned with a particular sex or age group, and can be attributed to a range of ethnographic purposes, such as status marking, coming of age, marriage, mourning, ornamentation or beautification.

=== Burial Goods ===
The burial goods found in the internments at Phum Sophy largely contained beads and ceramics as well as the artefacts relating to agriculture, metallurgy and textile production. The beads found within mortuary contexts at the site were made from exotic materials such as glass, carnelian and agate, as well as more common materials such as stone, indicating wealth. It is concluded that the rarity and quality of the beads and other burial goods found in an individual internment are indicative of wealth and/or social standing. An analysis of the perforation size and shape of the beads date them stylistically to the first few centuries AD. The high-alumina soda composition of the glass beads similarly dates to the same period. Whilst the beads have been identified as having potential Indian origins, other forms of jewellery found throughout the site have been likened to jewellery in Thailand and Vietnam, thus indicating a high level of cultural exchange and trade between Southeast Asia and South Asia. The ceramic vessels found at the site further reveal a strong affinity to the ‘Phimai Black’ ceramic ware tradition of the north-east Thailand Iron Age.
