= Gnathology =

Study of the masticatory system

Gnathology is the study of the masticatory system, including its physiology, functional disturbances, and treatment. Dr Beverly McCollum established the Gnathologic Society in 1926.

Chairman of the Board of Directors, David W. McLean DDS represented the So. Cal. Gnathology Society in 1929 in Mexico City, furthering the Society's work.

“The study of the relationship of the mandibular border movements and occlusal morphology, and how this relationship affects the anatomy, histology, physiology, pathology, and therapeutics of the oral organ, as well as how this relationship affects the rest of the body, including, but not limited to, the TMJ.” Dr. Jack Hockel, editor of Orthopedic Gnathology by Quintessence, 1983. Chapter 1 describes the ten characteristics of an Organic Occlusion, the goal of Gnathology.
