= Overeruption =

Dental condition

In dentistry, overeruption is the physiological movement of a tooth lacking an opposing partner in the dental occlusion. Because of the lack of opposing force and the natural eruptive potential of the tooth there is a tendency for the tooth to erupt out of the line of the occlusion.

== Etymology ==
The physiological movement of a tooth lacking an opposing partner in the dental occlusion is termed overeruption, hypereruption, supraeruption, supereruption or continuous eruption.

== Pathophysiology ==
Because of the lack of opposing force and the natural eruptive potential of the tooth there is a tendency for the tooth to erupt out of the line of the occlusion.

Not all teeth lacking an opposing tooth overerupt, even in the long term. Unopposed upper jaw molars overerupt more than the unopposed lower jaw molars. It is more severe in young people and periodontically affected people. The changes are most visible in the first year after the loss of the opposing tooth.

== Treatment ==
A systematic review on the treatment need for back jaw spaces without any teeth found that overeruption was limited to 2 mm for most studies reviewed. The authors of the review also noted the low quality of evidence and concluded that tooth replacement is not recommended as the chief therapy.

Overeruption can cause interferences in the occlusion and difficulty when constructing dentures. The alveolar bone typically overgrows, but root surfaces can be exposed to the oral environment increasing likelihood of dental caries. Overerupted teeth are often sharp due to lack of tooth wear (dental attrition) by adjacent teeth during chewing.

Overeruption is treated either by forcing the tooth back using orthodontic techniques, or by cutting the interfering part of the tooth and installing a crown.

== See also ==
- Dahl effect
