= Diagnostic wax-up =

Visualization of a dental prosthesis

An idealized diagnostic wax-up for a partially edentulous maxilla.

In dentistry, diagnostic wax-up is used to visualize the results of a prosthetic case prior to the treatment being executed.
