= Orthodontic indices =

Measures of teeth alignment

Orthodontic indices are one of the tools that are available for orthodontists to grade and assess malocclusion. Orthodontic indices can be useful for an epidemiologist to analyse prevalence and severity of malocclusion in any population.

== Angle's classification ==
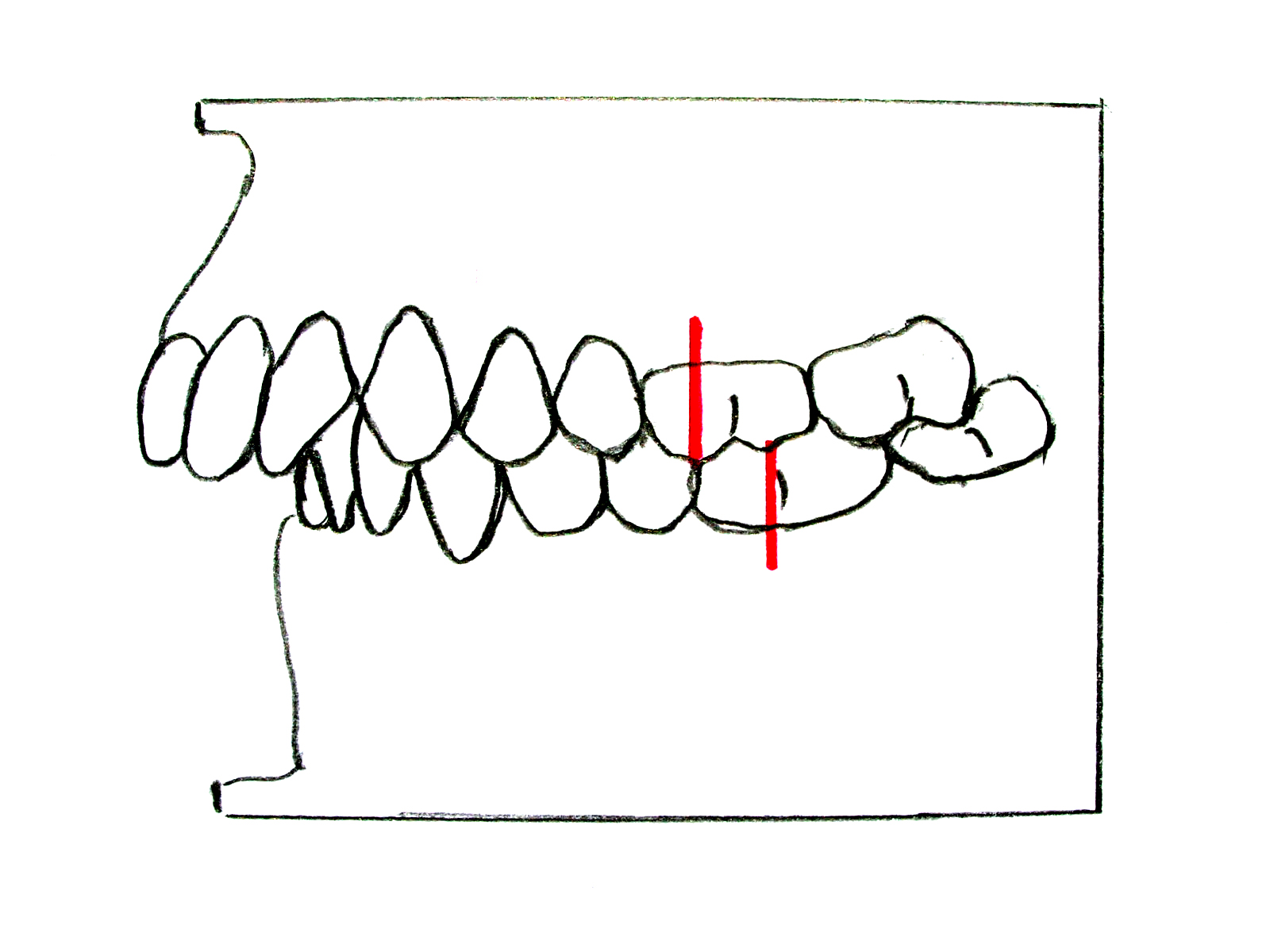
Angle classification: Class II Division 1

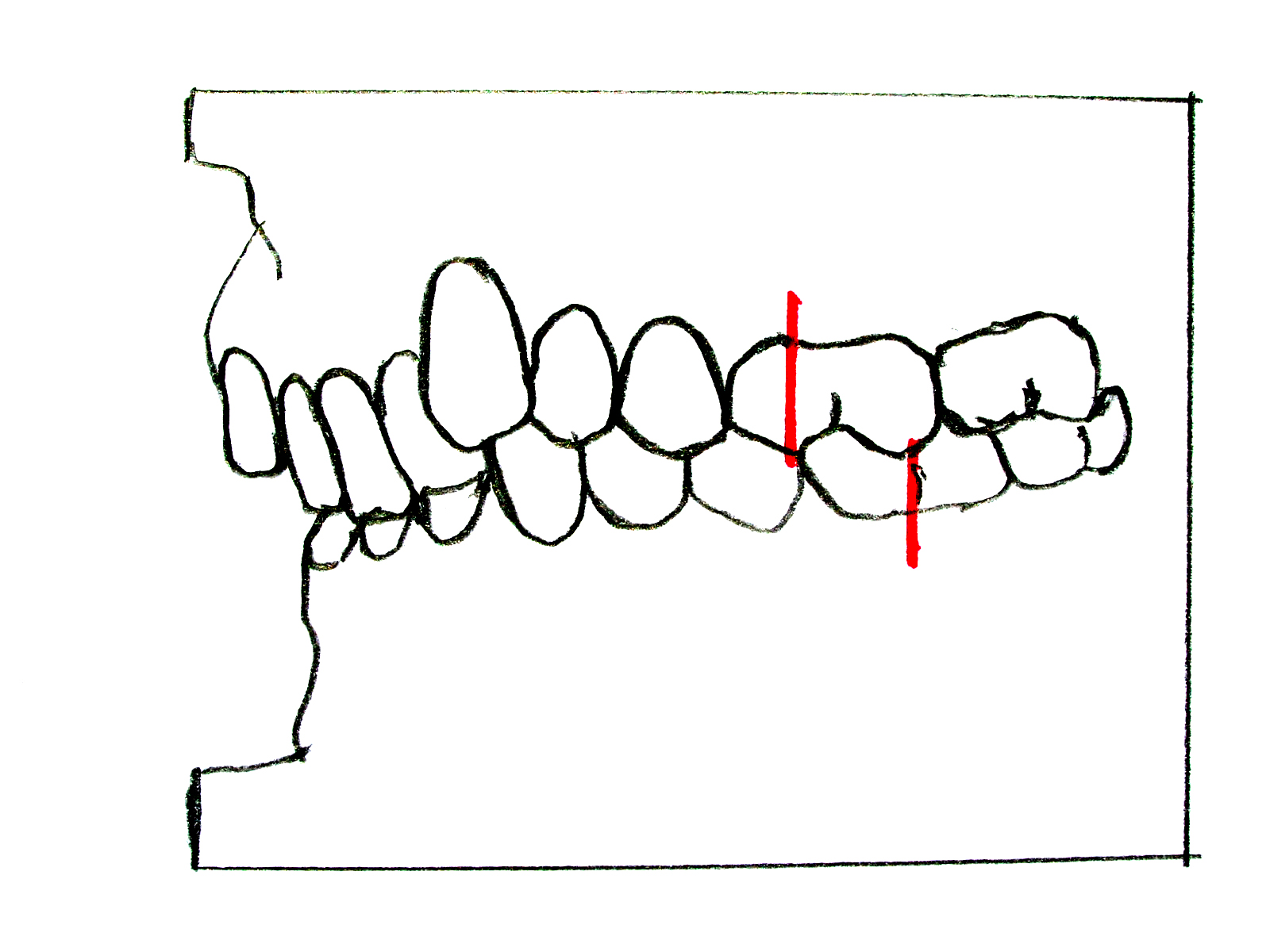
Angle classification: Class II Division 2

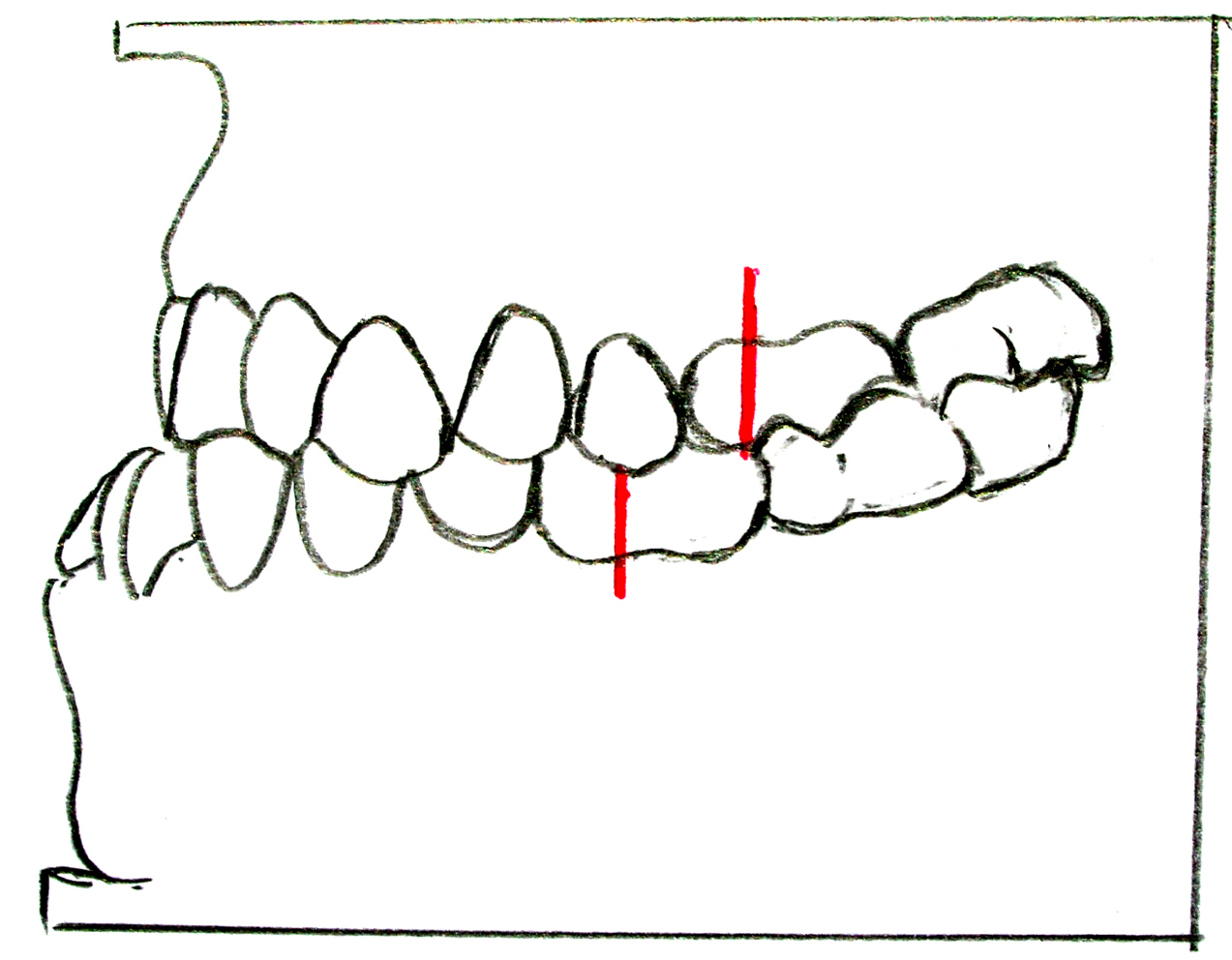
Angle classification: Class III

Angle's Classification is devised in 1899 by father of Orthodontic, Dr Edward Angle to describe the classes of malocclusion, widely accepted and widely used since it was published. Angle's Classification is based on the relationship of the mesiobuccal cusp of the maxillary first molar and the buccal groove of the mandibular first molar. Angle's Classification describes 3 classes of malocclusion:

- Class I: The molar relationship of the occlusion is normal or as described for the maxillary first molar, with malocclusion confined to anterior teeth
- Class II: The retrusion of the lower jaw with distal occlusion of the lower teeth (or in other words, the maxillary first molar occludes anterior to the buccal groove of the mandibular first molars)
  - Class II div 1: class II relationship with proclined upper central incisors (overjet)
  - Class II div 2: class II relationship with lingual inclination of upper central incisors (retrocline) and upper lateral incisors overlapping the centrals
- Class III: The protrusion of the lower jaw with mesiobuccal cusp of maxillary first molar occluding posterior to the buccal groove of the mandibular first molar, with lingually inclined lower incisors and cuspids

Angle's classification only considers anteroposterior deviations in the sagittal plane while malocclusion is a three dimensional problem (sagittal, transverse and vertical) rather than two dimensional as described in Angle's classification. Angle's classification also disregards the relationship of the teeth to the face.

== Massler and Frankel's index recording the number of displaced/rotated teeth ==
Introduced in 1951 by Massler & Frankel to produce a way to record the prevalence of malocclusion which will satisfy 3 criteria: simple, accurate and applicable to large groups of individual; yield quantitative information that could be statistically analysed; reproducible so that results are comparable. This index uses individual teeth as unit of occlusion instead of a segment of the arch. Each tooth is examined to determine whether it is in correct occlusion or it is maloccluded.

The total number of maloccluded teeth is the counted and recorded. Each tooth is examined from two different aspects: occlusal aspect and then the buccal and labial surfaces with the exclusion of third molars. Tooth that is not in perfect occlusion from both occlusal aspect (in perfect alignment with contact line) and buccal aspect (in perfect alignment with plane of occlusion and in correct interdigitation with opposing teeth) is considered as maloccluded. Each maloccluded tooth is given a value of 1 while tooth in perfect occlusion is given a score of 0. A score of 0 will indicate a perfect occlusion; score of more than 10 would be classified as sufficient severity that would require orthodontic treatment; score between 1 and 9 would be classified as normal occlusion in which no orthodontic treatment is indicated.

However, while this index is simple, easy and able to provide prevalence and incidence data in populations group, there are some major disadvantage with this index: primary dentition, erupting teeth and missing teeth are left out in the scoring system and difficulties in judging conformity of each tooth to an ideal position in all planes.

== Malalignment Index ==
Introduced in 1959 by Lawrence Vankirk and Elliott Pennell. This index requires the use of a small plastic, gauge-like tool designed for assessment. Tooth rotation and displacement are measured.

The mouth is divided into 6 segments, and is examined in the following order: maxillary anterior, maxillary right posterior, maxillary left posterior, mandibular anterior, mandibular right posterior and mandibular left posterior. The tool is superimposed over the teeth for the scoring measurement, each tooth present is scored 0, 1 or 2.

2 types of malalignment are being measured, rotation and displacement. Rotation is defined as the angle formed by the line projected through contact areas of observed tooth and the ideal arch line. Displacement is defined as both of the contact areas of the tooth are displaced in the same direction from the ideal alignment position.

- Score of 0 represents ideal alignment with no apparent deviation from the ideal arch line.
- Score of 1 represents minor malalignment: rotation of less than 45º and displacement of less than 1.5mm
- Score of 2 represents major malalignment: rotation of more than 45º and displacement of more than 1.5mm

== Handicapping Labiolingual Deviation Index (HLDI) ==
This index was proposed in 1960 by Harry L. Draker. HLDI was designed for identification of dento-facial handicap. The index is designed to yield prevalence data if used in screenings. Measurement taken are as following: cleft palate (all or nothing), severe traumatic deviation (all or none), overjet (mm), overbite (mm), mandibular protrusion (mm), anterior open bite (mm), labiolingual spread (measurement of tooth displacement in mm) HLD index is used in several states in the United States, with some modifications to its original form by the states that used them for determining orthodontic treatment need.

== Occlusal feature index ==
Occlusal Feature Index is introduced by Poulton and Aaronson in 1961. The index is based on four primary features of occlusion that is important in orthodontic examination. The four primary features are as following:

- Lower anterior crowding (canine to canine area)
- Posterior cuspal interdigitation (right posterior premolar to molar area)
- Vertical overbite (measured by portion of lower incisor covered by upper central incisors when in occlusion)
- Horizontal overjet (measured between the labial surface of upper incisor to labial surface of lower incisor)

Occlusal Feature Index recognises malocclusion is a combination of the way teeth occlude as well as the position of the teeth relative to the neighbouring teeth. However, the scoring system is not sensitive enough for case selection for orthodontic purposes.

== Malocclusion Severity Estimate (MSE) ==
Introduced in 1961 by Grainger. MSE measured 7 weighted and defined measurement:

- Overjet
- Overbite
- Anterior open bite
- Congenitally missing maxillary incisors
- First permanent molar relationship
- Posterior cross bite
- Tooth displacement (actual and potential)

MSE defined and outlined 6 syndromes of malocclusion:

1. Positive overjet and anterior open bite
2. Positive overjet, positive overbite, distal molar relationship and posterior crossbite with maxillary teeth buccal to mandibular teeth.
3. Negative overjet, mesial molar relationship and posterior crossbite with maxillary teeth lingual to mandibular teeth
4. Congenitally missing maxillary incisors
5. Tooth displacement
6. Potential tooth displacement

Despite being a relative comprehensive definition, there are a few shortcomings of this index, namely: the data is derived from a 12 years old patients hence might not be valid for deciduous and mixed dentitions, the score does not reflect all the measurement that were taken and accumulated and the absence of any occlusal disorder is not scored as zero. Grainger then revised the MSE index and published the revised version in 1967 and renamed the index to Treatment Priority Index (TPI).

== Occlusal Index (OI) ==
Occlusal Index was developed by Summers in his doctoral dissertation in 1966, and the final paper was published in 1971. Based on Malocclusion Severity Estimate (MSE), OI attempted to overcome the shortcoming of the MSE.

Summers devised different scoring scheme for deciduous, mixed and permanent dentition with 6 predefined stages of dental age:

1. Dental age 0 begins at birth, ending with the eruption of first deciduous tooth.
2. Dental age 1 begins when stage 0 ended, ending with all deciduous teeth are in occlusion.
3. Dental age 2 begins when stage 1 ended, ends with the eruption of first permanent tooth.
4. Dental age 3 begins when stage 2 ended and ends with all the permanent central, lateral incisors and first permanent molar are in occlusion.
5. Dental age 4 begins when stage 3 ended and ends with the eruption of any permanent canines or premolar.
6. Dental age 5 begins when stage 4 ended and ends with all permanent canines and premolar are in occlusion.
7. Dental age 6 begins when all permanent canines and premolar are in occlusion.

Nine weighted and defined measurement being taken:

- Molar relation
- Overbite
- Overjet
- Posterior crossbite
- Posterior open bite
- Tooth displacement
- Midline relation
- Maxillary median diastema
- Congenitally missing maxillary incisors

Summers also defined 7 malocclusion syndromes which includes:

1. Overjet and openbite
2. Distal molar relation, overbite, overjet, posterior crossbite, midline diastema and midline deviation
3. Congenitally missing maxillary incisors
4. Tooth displacement (actual and potential)
5. Posterior open bite
6. Mesial molar relation, overjet, overbite, posterior crossbite, midline diastema and midline deviation
7. Mesial molar relation, mixed dentition analysis (potential tooth displacement) and tooth displacement.

== Grade Index Scale for Assessment of Treatment Need (GISATIN) ==
Grade Index Scale for assessment of treatment need (GISATN) was created by Salonen L in 1966. GISATN grades the type and severity of the malocclusion, however, the index doesn't indicate or describe the damage each type of occlusion can cause.

== Treatment Priority Index (TPI) ==
Treatment priority index (TPI) was created in 1967 by R.M. Grainger in Washington D.C United States. Grainger described the index as “a method of assessing the severity of the most common types of malocclusion, the degree of handicaps or their priority of treatment”. In the index there are eleven weighed and defined measurements which are: upper anterior segment overjet, lower anterior segment overjet, overbite of upper anterior over lower anterior, anterior open bite, congenital absence of incisors, distal molar relation, mesial molar relation, posterior crossbite (buccal), posterior crossbite (lingual), tooth displacement, gross anomalies. It also includes the seven maloclussion syndromes: maxillary expansion syndrome, overbite, retrognathism, open bite, prognathism, maxillary collapse syndrome and congenitally missing incisors.

== Handicapping Malocclusion Assessment Record (HMAR) ==
Handicapping malocclusion assessment record (HMAR) was created by Salzmann JA in 1968. It was created to establish needs for treatment of handicapping malocclusion according to severity presented by magnitude of the score when assessing the malocclusion. The assessment can be made either directly from the oral cavity or from available casts. To make the assessment more accurate an additional record form is made for direct mouth assessment which allows the recording and scoring of mandibular function, facial asymmetry, lower lip malposition in relation to the maxillary incisor teeth and desirability of treatment. The index has been accepted as a standard by the Council or Orthodontic Health Care, the Board of Directors of the American Association due to the easy use of HMAR.

== Little's Irregularity Index (LII) ==
Little irregularity index was first written about in his published paper The Irregularity Index: a quantitative score of mandibular anterior alignment. The Littles Irregularity index is generally used by public health sectors and insurance companies to determine the need for treatment and the severity of the malocclusion. It is said that the method is “simple, reliable and valid” of which to measure linear displacement of the tooths contact point. The index is used by creating five linear lines of adjacent contact points starting from mesial of right canine to mesial of left canine and this is recorded. Once this is done the model cast can be ranked on a scale ranging from 0-10.

== WHO/FDI - basic method for recording of malocclusion ==
The WHO/FDI index uses the prevalence of malocclusion ion and estimates the needs for treatment of the population by various ways. It was developed by the Federation Dentaire Internationale (FDI) Commission on Classification and Statistics for Oral Conditions (COCSTOC). The aim when creating the index was to allow for a system in measuring occlusion which can be easily comparable. The five major groups which are recorded are as follows: 1. Gross Anomalies 2.Dentition: absent teeth, supernumerary teeth, malformed incisors and exotic eruption 3.Spaced condition: Diastema, Crowding and Spacing 4.Occlusion:

  * Incisor segment: maxillary /mandibular overjet, overbite, open bite and cross bite
  * Lateral segment: anteroposterior relations, open bite, posterior crossbite

5. Orthodontic treatment need judged subjectively : non necessary, doubtful and necessary

== Dental Aesthetic Index (DAI) ==
The aesthetic index created in 1986 by Cons NC and Jenny J and has been recognised by WHO by which it was added into the International Collaboration Study of Oral health Outcomes. The index links the aesthetic aspect and the clinical need plus the patients' perception and combines them mathematically to produce a single score. Even though DAI is widely recognised in the US, in Europe due to government pressures more effort was spent on defining patients with malocclusions which can be damaging and which can qualify under the government regulations to be paid for rather than looking at the aesthetic aspect.

== Handicapping Labiollingual Deviation (HLD) (CalMOD) ==
HLD was a suggestion by Dr. Harry L. Draker in 1960 in the published American Journal of Orthodontics in 1960. It was meant to identify the most unfavourable looking malocclusion as handicapping however it completely failed to recognise patients with a large maxillary protrusion with fairly even teeth, which would be seen extremely handicapped by the public. The index finally became a law driven modification of the 1960 suggestion by Dr. Harry L. Draker and became the HLD (CalMod) Index of California. In 1994, California was sued once again and the settlement from this allowed for adjustments to be made. This allowed overjets greater than 9mm to qualify as an exception, correcting the failure of the previous modification. To settle the suit and respond to plaintiff's wishes a reverse overate greater than 3.5mm was also included into the qualifying exception. The modification later went into official use in 1991.

The intent of the HLD (CalMod) index is measuring the presence or absence, and the degree of the handicap caused by components of the index and not to diagnose malocclusion. The measurements for the index are made with a Boley Gauge (or a disposable ruler) scaled in millimetres. Absence of a condition must be presented by entering ‘0’.

These are the various conditions you have to take into consideration:

1. Cleft palata deformities
2. Deep impinging overbite
3. Cross bite of individual anterior teeth
4. Severe traumatic deviations
5. Overjet greater than 9mm
6. Overjet in mm
7. Overbite in mm
8. Mandibular protrusion in mm
9. Open bite in mm
10. Ectopic eruption
11. Anterior crowding
12. Labiolingual spread
13. Posterior unilateral Crossbite

Once this is completed and all the checks are done, the scores are added up. If the patient does not score 26 or above they may still be eligible under the EPSDT (Early and Periodic Screening, Diagnostic and Treatment) exception, if medical necessity is documented.

== Peer Assessment Rating Index (PAR) ==
This index was implemented in 1987 by the British Orthodontic Standard Working Party after 10 members of this party formulated this index over a series of 6 meetings

This index is a fast, simple and robust way of assessing the standard of orthodontic treatment that an individual orthodontist is achieving or trying to achieve rather than the degree of malocclusion and/or need for orthodontic treatment. However, it should have already been concluded that these patients should be receiving orthodontic treatment prior to the PAR index. The PAR index has also been used to assess whether clinicians are correctly determining the need for orthodontic treatment when compared with a calibrated examiner of malocclusion.

This type of index compares outcomes of orthodontic treatment as it primarily observes the results of a group of patients, rather than on an individual basis against results that they would expect. This type of testing occurs as there will always be a small number of individual patients in which the index results do not fully represent. The interpretation of the results shows that when there is a PAR score of more than 70% it represents a very high standard of treatment, anything less than 50% shows an overall poor standard of treatment and below 30% means that the patients malocclusion has not been improved by orthodontic treatment

The results should only be compared using a group of patients rather than individual bases as this could show completely different results which wouldn't be representative of the standard of treatment being carried out

== Index of Orthodontic Treatment Need (IOTN) ==
The Index of Orthodontic Treatment Need was developed and tested in 1989 by Brook and Shaw in England following a government initiative.

The aim of the IOTN is to assess the probable impact a malocclusion may have on an individual's dental health and psychosocial wellbeing. The index easily identifies the individuals who will benefit most from orthodontic treatment and assigns them a treatment priority. Hence, in the UK, it is used to determine whether a patient under the age of 18 years is eligible for orthodontic treatment on the NHS.

It comprises two elements: the dental health component and an aesthetic component.

For the dental health component (DHC), malocclusion is categorised into 5 grades based on occlusal characteristics that could affect the function and longevity of the dentition. The index is not cumulative; the single worst feature of a malocclusion determines the grade assigned.

Dental health component of the IOTN
Grade 5 (treatment required)
5.a Increased overjet >9mm

5.h Extensive hypodontia with restorative implications (more than one tooth missing in any quadrant requiring pre-restorative orthodontics)

5.i Impeded eruption of teeth (apart from 3rd molars) due to crowding, displacement, the presence of supernumerary teeth, retained deciduous teeth, and any pathological cause

5.m Reverse overjet >3.5mm with reported masticatory and speech difficulties

5.p Defects of cleft lip and palate

5.s Submerged deciduous teeth

Grade 4 (treatment required)
4.a Increased overjet >6mm but ≤9mm

4.b Reverse overjet >3.5mm with no masticatory or speech difficulties

4.c Anterior or posterior crossbites with >2mm discrepancy between the retruded contact position and intercuspal position

4.d Severe displacements of teeth >4

4.e Extreme lateral or anterior open bites >4mm

4.f Increased and complete overbite with gingival or palatal trauma

4.g Less extensive hypodontia requiring pre-restorative orthodontics or orthodontic space closure to obviate the need for a prosthesis

4.h Posterior lingual crossbite with no functional occlusal contact in one or more buccal segments

4.i Reverse overjet >1mm but <3.5mm with recorded masticatory and speech difficulties

4.j Partially erupted teeth, tipped and impacted against adjacent teeth

4.k Existing supernumerary teeth

Grade 3 (borderline/moderate need)
3.a Increased overjet >3.5mm but ≤6mm (incompetent lips)

3.b Reverse overjet greater than 1 mm but ≤3.5mm

3.c Anterior or posterior crossbites with >1mm but ≤2mm discrepancy between the retruded contact position and intercuspal position

3.d Displacement of teeth >2mm but ≤4mm

3.e Lateral or anterior open bite >2mm but ≤4mm

3.f Increased and incomplete overbite without gingival or palatal trauma

Grade 2 (little treatment need)
2.a Increased Overjet >3.5 mm but ≤6 mm (with competent lips)

2.b Reverse overjet greater than 0 mm but ≤1mm

2.c Anterior or posterior crossbite with ≤1mm discrepancy between retruded contact position and intercuspal position

2.d Displacement of teeth >1mm but ≤2mm

2.e Anterior or posterior open bite >1mm but ≤2mm

2.f Increased overbite ≥3.5mm (without gingival contact)

2.g Pre-normal or post-normal occlusions with no other anomalies. Includes up to half a unit discrepancy

Grade 1 (no treatment required)
1. Extremely minor malocclusions, including displacements less than 1mm

The aesthetic component (AC) takes into consideration the potential psychosocial impact of a malocclusion. A scale of 10 standardised colour photographs showing decreasing levels of dental attractiveness is used. The pictures are compared to the patient's teeth, when viewed in occlusion from the anterior aspect, by an orthodontist who will score accordingly. The scores are categorised according to treatment need:

- Score 1 or 2 – no need
- Score 3 or 4 – slight need
- Score 5, 6, or 7 – moderate/borderline
- Score 8, 9, or 10 – definite need

The AC has been criticised due to its subjective nature and for the lack of representation of Class III malocclusions and anterior open bites in the photographs used.

Often, the DHC score alone is used to determine treatment need. However, the AC is often used in borderline cases (DHC grade 3). The IOTN is used in the following manner:

Grading	Treatment Required	Reasoning
DHC 1	No NHS orthodontic treatment	Lack of health benefit due to almost perfect occlusion
DHC 2	No NHS orthodontic treatment	Lack of health benefit as patient has minor occlusion irregularities
DHC 3 and AC 1-5	Normally no NHS orthodontic treatment unless there are exceptional circumstances*	Lack of health benefit even though there are greater irregularities. *patient with a Class II Division 2 malocclusion with traumatic over bite
DHC 3 and AC 6-10, or DHC 4-5	Eligible for NHS orthodontic treatment	More severe degree of irregularity to severe dental health problems

== Memorandum of Orthodontic Screen and Indication for Orthodontic Treatment ==
This index was implemented in 1990 by Danish national board of health.

In 1990 a Danish system was introduced based on health risks related to malocclusion, where it describes possible damages and problems arising from untreated malocclusion which allows for the identification of treatment need.

This mandate introduced a descriptive index that is more valid from a biological view, using qualitative analysis instead of a quantitative.

== Ideal Tooth Relationship Index ==
The ITRI was established in 1992 by Haeger which utilises both intra-arch and inter-arch relationships to generate index scores to compare the entire dentitions occlusion. This index is of use as it divides the arches into segments which would result in a more accurate outcome.

This index evaluates tooth relationships from a morphological perspective which has been of use when evaluating the results of orthodontic treatment, post-treatment stability, settling, relapse and different orthodontic treatment modalities.

The ITRI can allow for comparisons to be made in an objective and quantitative manner that allows for statistical analysis of orthodontic outcomes.

== Need for Orthodontic Treatment Index (NOTI) ==
This index was first described and implemented in 1992 by Espeland LV et al and is also known as the Norwegian Orthodontic Treatment Index.

This index is used by the Norwegian health insurance system and due to this it is designed for allocation of public subsidies of treatment expenses, and the amount of reimbursement which is related to the category of treatment need. It classifies malocclusions into four categories based on the necessity of the treatment need.

== Risk of Malocclusion Assessment (ROMA) ==
This is a tool used to assess treatment need in young patients by evaluating malocclusion problems in growing children, assuming that some aspects may change under positive or negative effects of craniofacial development. It was published for use in 1998 by Russo et al.

This index illustrates the need for orthodontic intervention and is used to establish a relationship between the registered onset of orthodontic treatment and disorders inhibiting growth of facial and alveolar bones, and the development of the dentition along with the IOTN index.

This index can be used in exchange for the IOTN scale as it is quick and easy to apply as a screening test to decide whether and when to refer patients to specialist orthodontists.

== Index of Complexity, Outcome and Need (ICON) ==
This index was produced in 2000 by Charles Daniels and Stephen Richmond in Cardiff and has been investigated to illustrate that it can be used to replace the PAR and IOTN scale as a means of determining need and outcome of orthodontic treatment.

This index measures the following to produce a scoring system:

- Dental aesthetics as measured by the aesthetic component of the IOTN
- The presence of a crossbite
- Anterior vertical relationship as measured by PAR
- Upper arch crowding/spacing on a 5-point scale
- Buccal segment Antero-posterior relationship as measured by PAR.

The measurements are added together to produce a score which can be interpreted by score ranges that give need for treatment, complexity and degree of improvement.

This system claims to be more efficient than the PAR and IOTN indices as it only requires a single measurement protocol but this has still to be validated to be used in the UK and the issue that It does not suitably predict appearance, function, speech or treatment need for individuals attending general dental practice for routine dental treatment, so for these reasons is it generally never used.

== Baby-ROMA ==
This was established in 2014 by Grippaudo et al for use in assessing the risks/benefits of early orthodontic therapies in the primary dentition.

It is a paediatric type version of the ROMA scale. It measures occlusal parameters, skeletal and functional factors that may represent negative risks for a physiological development of the orofacial region, and indicates the need for preventative or interceptions orthodontic treatment using a score scale.

This index was designed as it has been observed that some of the malocclusion signs observed in the primary dentition can deteriorate with growth while others remain the same over time and others can even improve. This index is therefore used to classify the malocclusions observed at an early stage on a risk-based scale.

== Aesthetic Based Orthodontic Indexes ==
Assessment of the aesthetics is mostly subjective and any orthodontic index which has an aesthetic component can reduce the objectivity of the index in determining the need for treatment and theoretically not suitable for assessing orthodontic treatment need in a research setting or resource allocation.
