= Posterior teeth =

Premolar and molar teeth

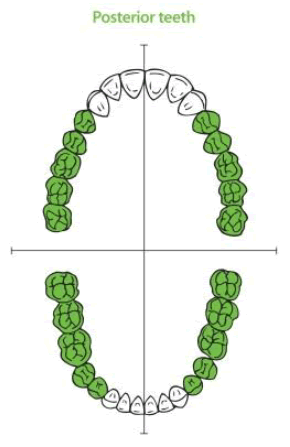
Chart of posterior teeth.

In dentistry, the term posterior teeth usually refers as a group to the premolars and molars, as distinguished from the anterior teeth, which are the incisors and canine teeth. The simplest way of distinguishing between anterior teeth and posterior teeth is that posterior (back) teeth are situated at the back of the mouth. It can be said that the anterior teeth are tailored to biting (breaking the food into chewable chunks) whereas the posterior teeth are tailored to chewing (comminuting the food into swallowable particles).

Anterior teeth are inherently more accessible than are posterior teeth. Sometimes dental health and choice of dental treatment are influenced by this factor.
