= Anterior teeth =

Incisors and canine teeth

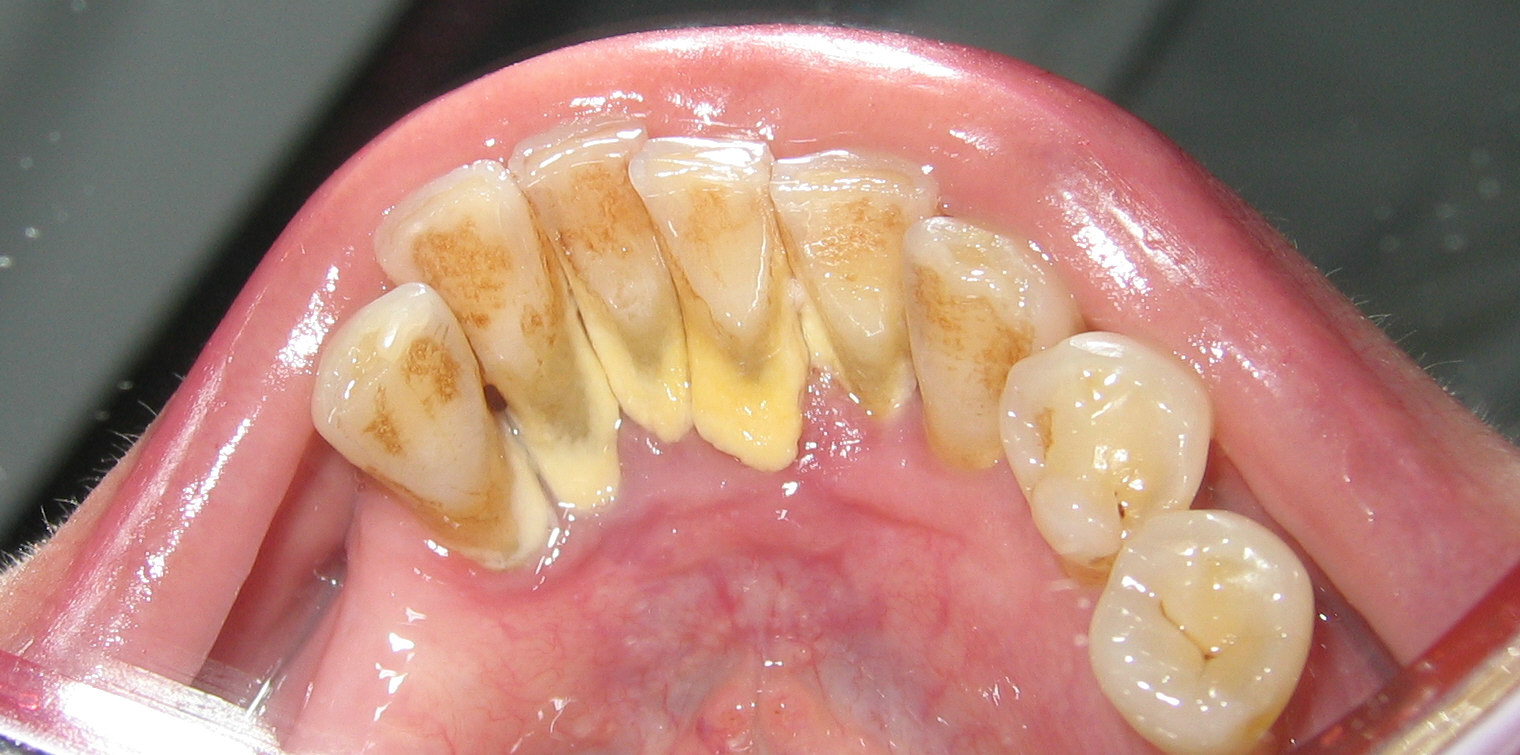
Mandibular anterior calculus

In dentistry, the term anterior teeth usually refers as a group to the incisors and canine teeth as distinguished from the posterior teeth, which are the premolars and molars. The distinction is one of anterior (front of the body) versus posterior (rear of the body). The distinction holds in both the upper jaw (maxilla) and lower jaw (mandible). As a rough guide, it can be said that the anterior teeth are tailored to biting (breaking the food into chewable chunks) whereas the posterior teeth are tailored to chewing (comminuting the food into swallowable particles).

Anterior teeth are inherently more accessible than are posterior teeth. Sometimes dental health and choice of dental treatment are influenced by this factor.
