= Centric relation =

Dentistry jaw position

In dentistry, centric relation is the mandibular jaw position in which the head of the condyle is situated as far anterior and superior as it possibly can within the mandibular fossa/glenoid fossa.

It is defined as, "The maxillo-mandibular relationship in which the condyles articulate with the thinnest avascular portion of their respective discs with the complex in the anterior-superior position against the slopes of the articular eminences. This position is independent of tooth contact. This position is clinically discernible when the mandible is directed superiorly and anteriorly. It is restricted to a purely rotary movement about the transverse horizontal axis". — GPT.

This position is used when restoring edentulous patients with removable or either implant-supported hybrid or fixed prostheses. Because the dentist wants to be able to reproducibly relate the patient's maxilla and mandible, but the patient does not have teeth with which to establish his or her own vertical dimension of occlusion, another method has been devised to achieve this goal. The condyle can only be in the same place as it was the last time it was positioned by the dentist if it is consistently moved to the most superior and anterior position within the fossa.

It is a physiologic position that is used for reproducibility. The Temporomandibular Joint is not restricted to Centric Relation in function. At the most superior position, the condyle-disc assemblies are braced medially, thus centric relation is also the midmost position. A properly aligned condyle-disc assembly in centric relation can resist maximum loading by the elevator muscles with no sign of discomfort. It also allows for the most repeatable and recordable position, and therefore should be used when designing an appropriate occlusion.

Methods of Recording Centric Relation:

- Physiological Methods
1. Tactile or inter-occlusal check record method
2. Pressureless method
3. Pressure method
- Functional Methods
1. Needlehouse method
2. Patterson method
- Graphic Methods
1. Intraoral method
2. Extraoral method
- Radiographic method
