= Chewing =

Mechanical procedure for crushing the food and its first enzymatic splitting

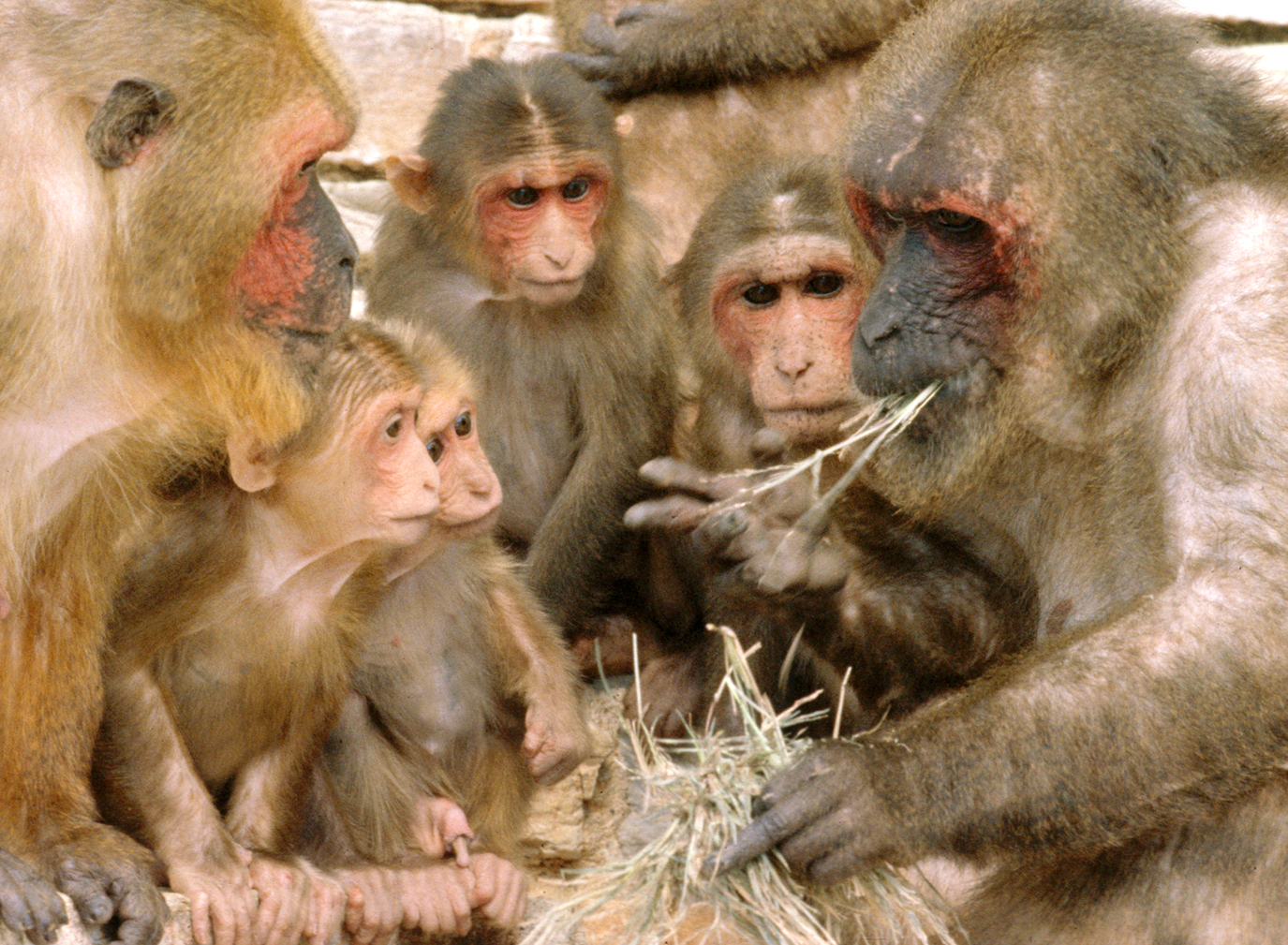
A stump-tailed macaque using mastication to process tough plant matter

Chewing or mastication is the process by which food is crushed and ground by the teeth. It is the first step in the process of digestion, allowing a greater surface area for digestive enzymes and bile to break down the foods.

During the mastication process, the food is positioned by the cheek and tongue between the teeth for grinding. The muscles of mastication move the jaws to bring the teeth into intermittent contact, repeatedly opening and closing. As chewing continues, and the digestive enzymes in saliva (especially amylase and lingual lipase) begin to break down carbohydrates and other nutrients, the food is made softer and warmer, forming a food bolus ready to be swallowed. It enters the esophagus and via peristalsis continues on to the stomach, where the next step of digestion occurs. Increasing the number of chews per bite stimulates the production of digestive enzymes and peptides and has been shown to increase diet-induced thermogenesis (DIT) by activating the sympathetic nervous system. Studies suggest that thorough chewing may facilitate digestion and nutrient absorption, improve cephalic insulin release and glucose excursions, and decrease food intake and levels of self-reported hunger. More thorough chewing of foods that are high in protein or difficult to digest such as nuts, seeds, and meat, may help to release more of the nutrients contained in them, whereas taking fewer chews of starchy foods such as bread, rice, and pasta may actually help slow the rate of rise in postprandial glycemia by delaying gastric emptying and intestinal glucose absorption. However, slower rates of eating facilitated by more thorough chewing may benefit postprandial glucose excursions by enhancing insulin production and help to curb overeating by promoting satiety and GLP-1 secretion. Chewing gum has been around for many centuries; there is evidence that northern Europeans chewed birch bark tar 9,000 years ago.

Mastication, as it requires specialized teeth, is mostly a mammalian adaptation that appeared in early Synapsids, although some later herbivorous dinosaurs, now extinct, also developed chewing, too. Today only modern mammals chew in the strictest sense of the word, but some fish species exhibit a somewhat similar behavior. By contrast, mastication is not found in any living birds, amphibians, or reptiles.

Premastication is sometimes performed by human parents for infants who are unable to do so for themselves. The food is masticated in the mouth of the parent into a bolus and then transferred to the infant for consumption (some other animals also premasticate).

Cattle and some other animals, called ruminants, chew food more than once to extract more nutrients. After the first round of chewing, this food is called cud.

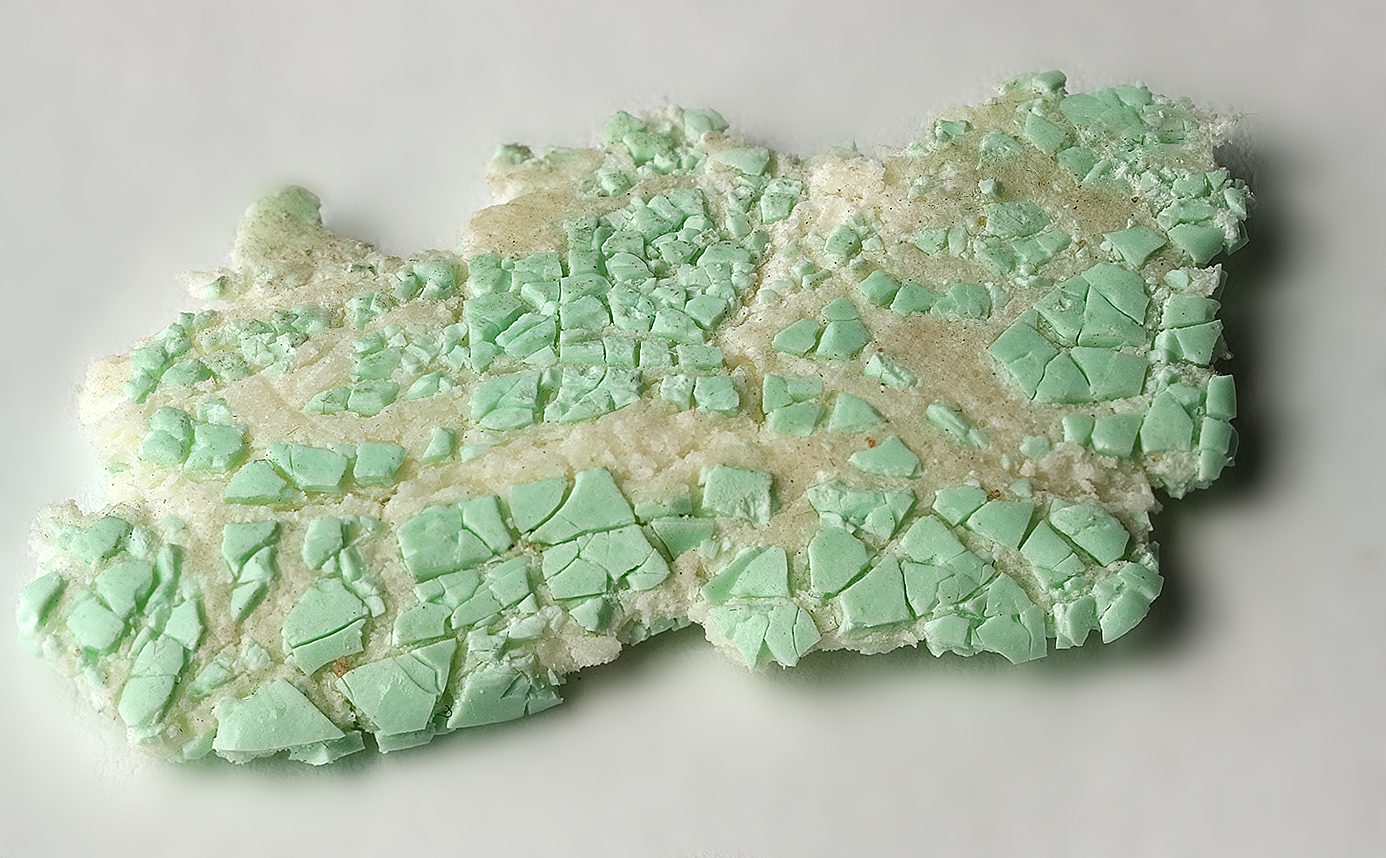
A piece of chewing gum after being trodden on.

== Chewing motor program ==
A water buffalo chewing cud

Chewing is primarily an unconscious (semi-autonomic) act, but can be mediated by higher conscious input. The motor program for mastication is a hypothesized central nervous system function by which the complex patterns governing mastication are created and controlled.

It is thought that feedback from proprioceptive nerves in teeth and the temporomandibular joints govern the creation of neural pathways, which in turn determine duration and force of individual muscle activation (and in some cases muscle fiber groups as in the masseter and temporalis).

This motor program continuously adapts to changes in food type or occlusion. This adaptation is a learned skill that may sometimes require relearning to adapt to loss of teeth or to dental appliances such as dentures.

It is thought that conscious mediation is important in the limitation of parafunctional habits as most commonly, the motor program can be excessively engaged during periods of sleep and times of stress. It is also theorized that excessive input to the motor program from myofascial pain or occlusal imbalance can contribute to parafunctional habits.

== Nutrition and health ==
Chewing stimulates saliva production and increases sensory perception of the food being eaten, controlling when the food is swallowed. Evidence from one study suggests that chewing almonds 25-40 times kept people fuller while also allowing them to get more nutrients out of the almonds. The researchers also suggest that this is likely to be the case in other foods. A 2015 systemic review found evidence that chewing can decrease self-reported hunger and therefore food intake. Eating food which does not require chewing, by choice or for medical reasons as tooth loss, is known as a soft diet. Such a diet may lead to inadequate nutrition due to a reduction in fruit and vegetable intake.

Chewing also stimulates the hippocampus and is necessary to maintain its normal function. Chewing stimulates hippocampal neurogenesis in both humans and mice.

== In other animals ==
Chewing is largely an adaptation for mammalian herbivory to help break down food faster. Carnivores generally chew very little or swallow their food whole or in chunks. This act of gulping without chewing has inspired the English idiom "wolfing it down".

Other animals such as cows chew their food for long periods to allow for proper digestion in a process known as rumination. Rumination in cows has been shown by researchers to intensify during the night. They concluded that cows chewed more intently in the night time compared to the morning.

Ornithopods, a group of dinosaurs including the Hadrosaurids ("duck-bills"), developed teeth analogous to mammalian molars and incisors during the Cretaceous period; this advanced, cow-like dentition allowed the creatures to obtain more nutrients from the tough plant life. This may have given them the advantage needed to compete with the formidable sauropods, who depended on their massive gastrointestinal tracts to digest food without grinding it.

== In machinery ==
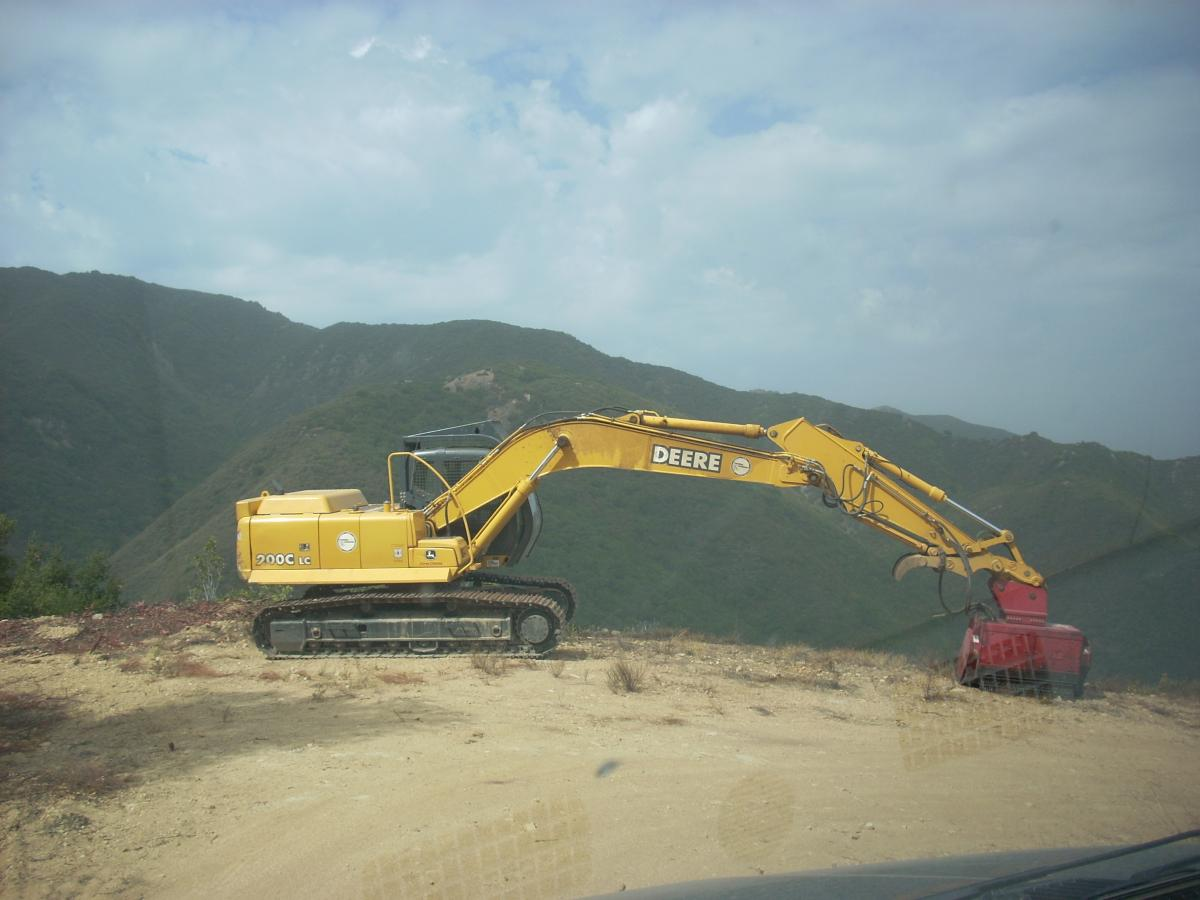
Masticator on the Zaca Fire

The process of chewing has, by analogy, been applied to machinery. The U.S. Forest Service uses a machine called a masticator (also called a forestry mulching machine) to "chew" through brush and timber in order to clear firelines in advance of a wildfire.

== See also ==
- Biting
- Gnathology
- Muscles of mastication
- Horace Fletcher
- Chewing gum
