= Denture cleaner =

Product used to clean dentures

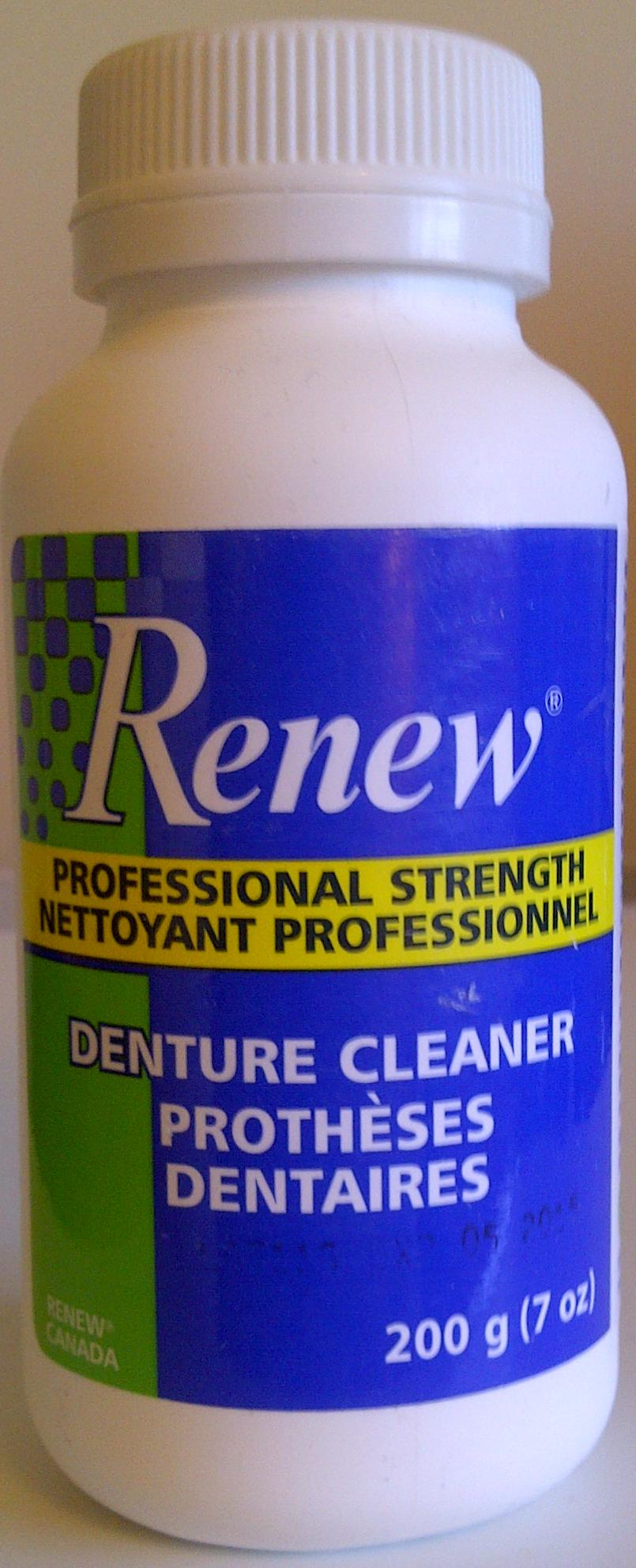
Bottle of Renew professional strength denture cleaner in powder format

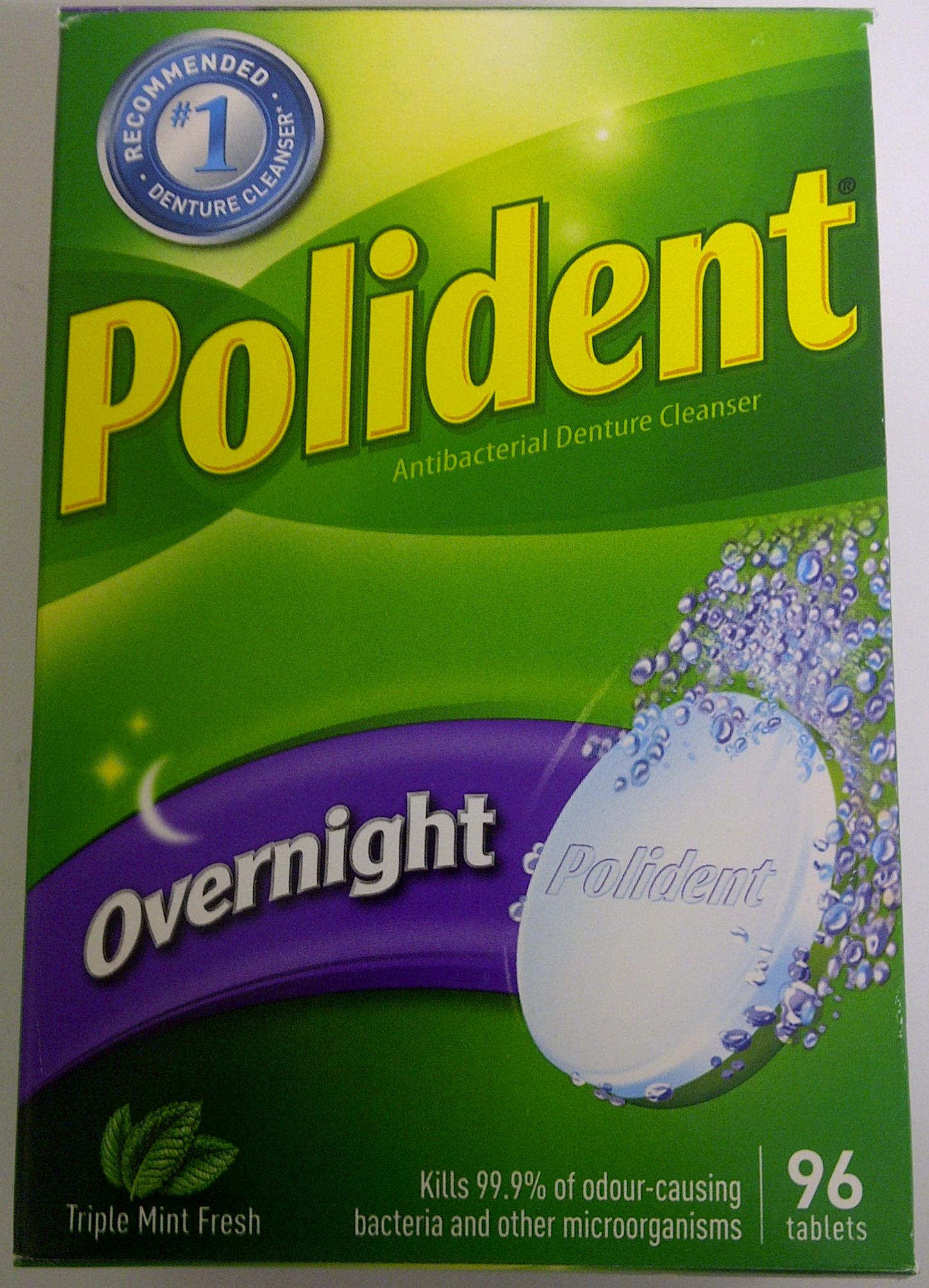
Box of Polident overnight denture cleaner in tablet format

A denture cleaner (also termed denture cleanser) is used to clean dentures when they are out of the mouth. The primary purpose is to control the growth of microorganisms on dentures, especially the fungal species Candida albicans, thereby preventing denture-related stomatitis (also known as denture sore mouth or chronic atrophic candidiasis). When dentures are worn in the mouth, a biofilm develops which may be similar to dental plaque, composed of bacteria, fungi, and other microorganisms embedded in a polysaccharide matrix. Over time, this biofilm may become hardened and mineralized as dental calculus (tarite), which is more difficult to remove and can harbour pathogenic microorganisms. Denture cleansers are also used to remove stains and other debris that may be caused by diet, tobacco use, or consuming coffee, tea, red wine or other pigmented foods and beverages.

== Types of denture cleaners ==
=== Chemical cleaners ===
Chemical denture cleaners are available in various formats to suit different user preferences and cleaning requirements. Common forms include creams, liquids, powders, pastes, and tablets. Many chemical denture cleaners are effervescent, releasing oxygen bubbles when dissolved in water to help dislodge debris and penetrate porous surfaces of the denture material. Non-effervescent formulations, such as immersion solutions containing sodium hypochlorite (dilute bleach) or chlorhexidine, rely on chemical action alone to disinfect and clean. Active ingredients in commercial denture cleansers may include alkaline peroxides, alkaline hypochlorites, acids, enzymes (such as proteases and mutanases), and disinfectants.

=== Mechanical cleaners ===
Mechanical denture cleaning methods include the use of denture brushes, which are specially designed with bristle configurations to reach all surfaces of the denture prosthesis. Ultrasonic denture cleaners employ ultrasonic cleaning technology, using high-frequency sound waves to create cavitation bubbles that implode and dislodge debris from denture surfaces. Some advanced ultrasonic cleaners are coupled with ultraviolet light (UV-C) to provide additional antimicrobial action by damaging the DNA of microorganisms.

== Recommendations for use ==
Dental professionals generally recommend that dentures be cleaned at least once daily to prevent biofilm accumulation. Dentures should be removed from the mouth during sleep to allow oral tissues to recover and to reduce the risk of denture-related stomatitis. When not being worn, dentures should be kept moist to prevent warping or cracking of the acrylic material. Combining mechanical brushing with chemical cleansing provides optimal results for maintaining denture hygiene.

== Ingredients ==
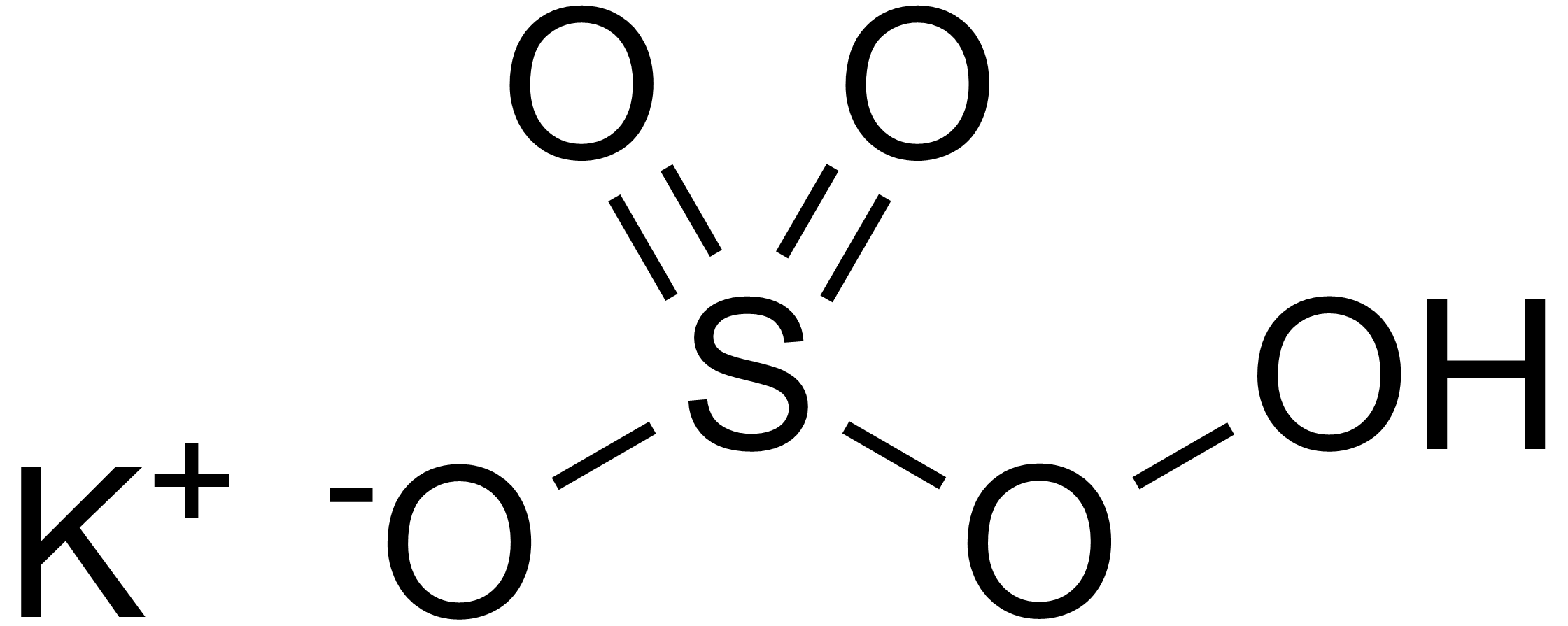
Potassium peroxymonosulfate, an oxidant, is widely used component of denture whiteners.

Dilute sodium hypochlorite (i.e. a mild bleach) is the main constituent of several brands of denture cleanser.

Other ingredients include such chemicals as:

- Sodium bicarbonate – or baking soda, which alkalizes the water, cleaning the dentures
- Citric acid – removes stains
- Sodium perborate
- Sodium polyphosphate
- Potassium monopersulfate – cleaning and bleaching agent
- EDTA

== Example commercial brands ==
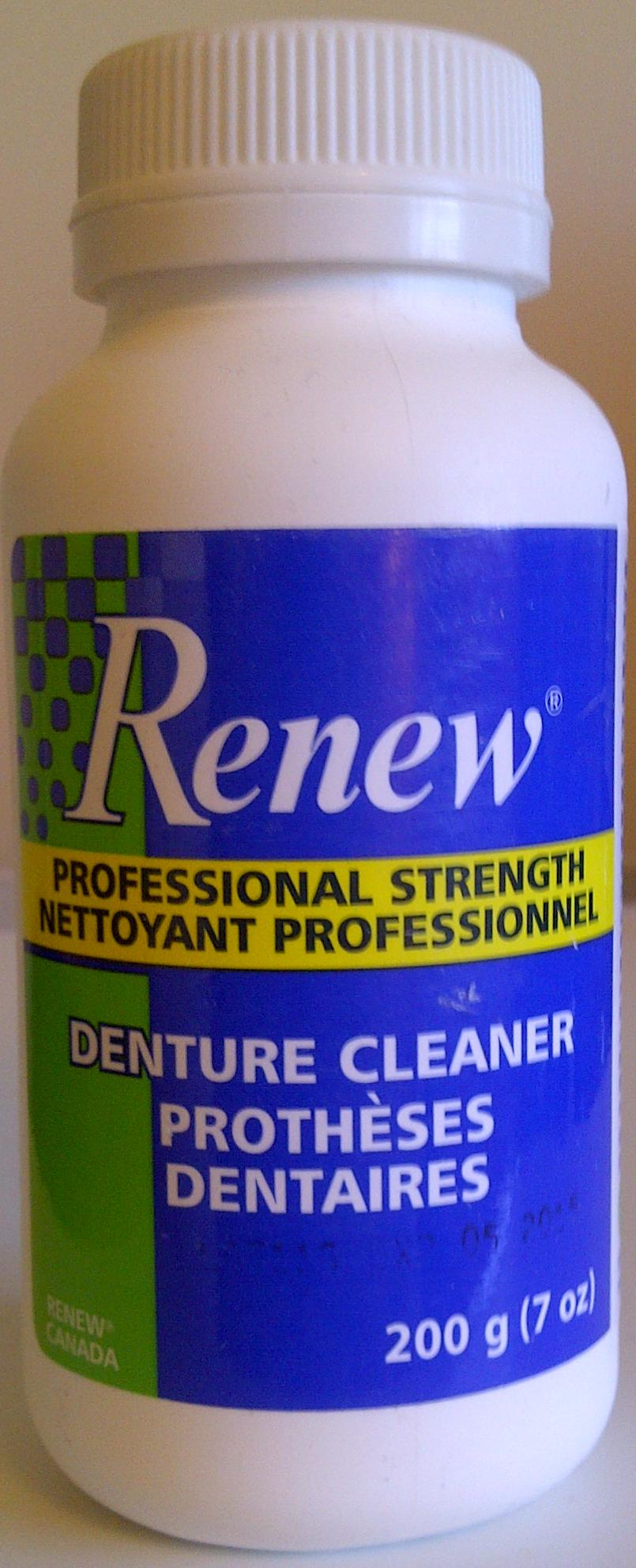
Bottle of Renew professional strength denture cleaner in powder format

- Sodium hypochlorite solution: Dentural, Milton, Mildent
- Alkaline peroxides: Steradent
- Other: Polident, Renew, Efferdent, Novadent

== History ==
Dentures have been cleaned using water or mixtures of water/vinegar, water/lemon juice, water/baking soda for many years. In the 1930s, Alexander Block developed the Polident brand of denture cleaner at the Block Drug Company. Others have followed such as Warner-Lambert's introduction of Efferdent denture cleanser tablets in 1966 and Renew denture cleaner powder in 1986 by Mid-Continental Dental Supply Co. Ltd. Over time, orthodontic and sport dental appliance cleaners have also emerged on the market such as Renew Ortho & Sport with formulations that account for thermoplastics and a younger demographic of patients.

== Clinical trials and evidence ==
Studies have found an association between denture stomatitis, colonization of yeasts and denture cleanliness. Another study found that immersing dentures in 0.5% NaOCl solution for 3 minutes only can be an effective synergic for denture cleaning in reducing the number of microorganism without affecting the denture color or surface roughness, and when compared to alkaline peroxides, bleach was more efficient. Some clinicians recommended that the time of immersion, and the concentration of the NaOCl should be well considered so as not to degrade the acrylic resin of the denture.

== See also ==
- Dentures
- Oral hygiene
- Denture-related stomatitis
- Candidiasis
