= Frederick Stanton =

Frederick Stanton may refer to:

- Frederick P. Stanton (1814–1894), member of the United States House of Representatives from Tennessee
- Frederick Stanton (RAF officer) (1895–1979), British World War I flying ace
- Frederick Lester Stanton (1873–1945), American orthodontist

== See also ==
- Fredrik Stanton, political scientist
