= Wax rims =

Dental devices

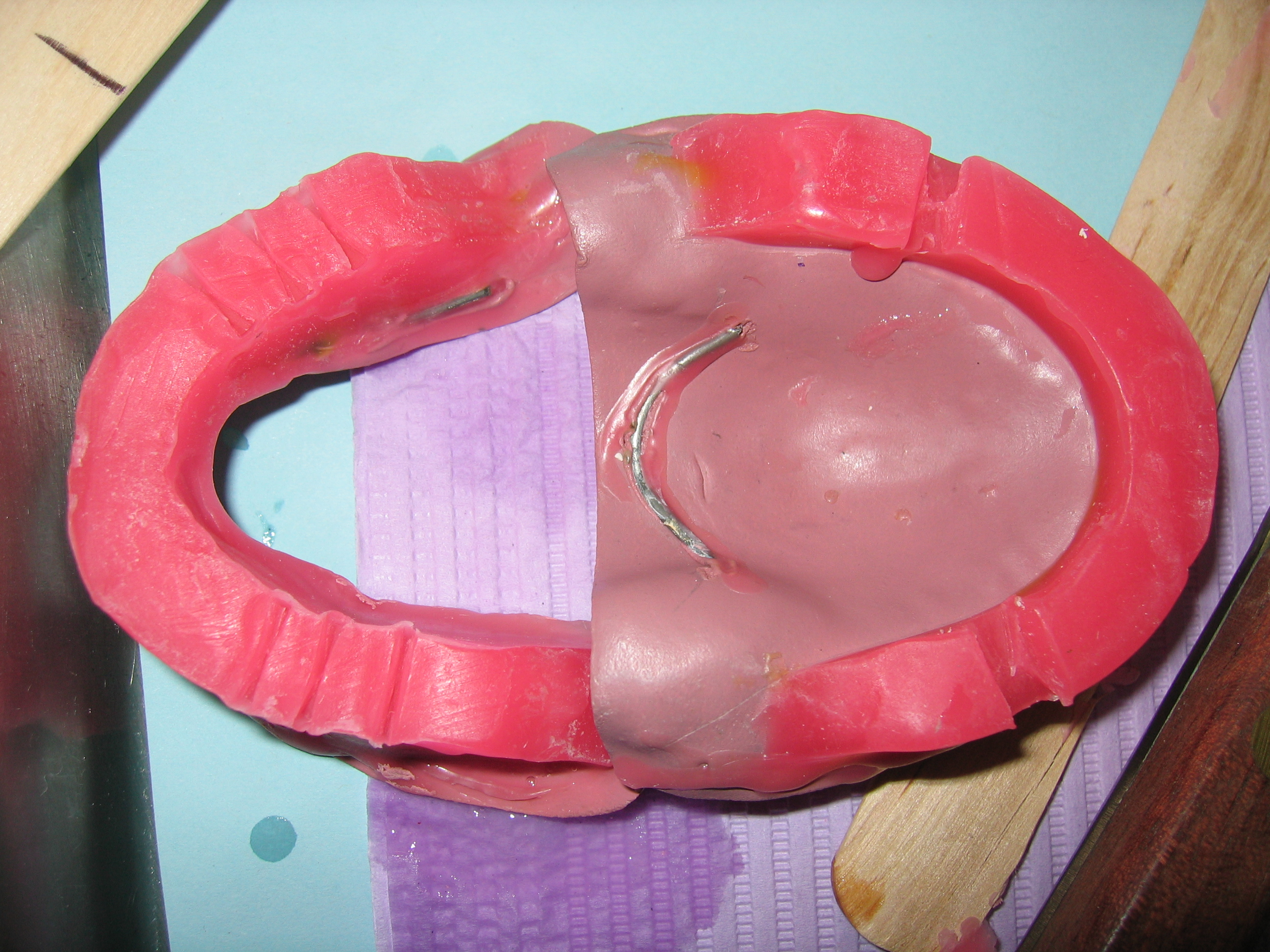
Maxillary and mandibular record bases with notched wax rims.

Wax rims are devices that are used in dentistry to help in the fabrication of removable prostheses, such as complete and partial dentures.

When placed in the mouth, wax rims allow the dentist to record a measured vertical dimension of occlusion (VDO) because the patient will be unable to close further than the wax will allow. The wax is built up or removed until the appropriate VDO has been established. The rims are then notched in order to allow an index of the relationship of the maxillary rim to the mandibular rim with an impressionable medium, such as Alluwax or Regisal.
