= Complete dentures =

Denture for toothless people

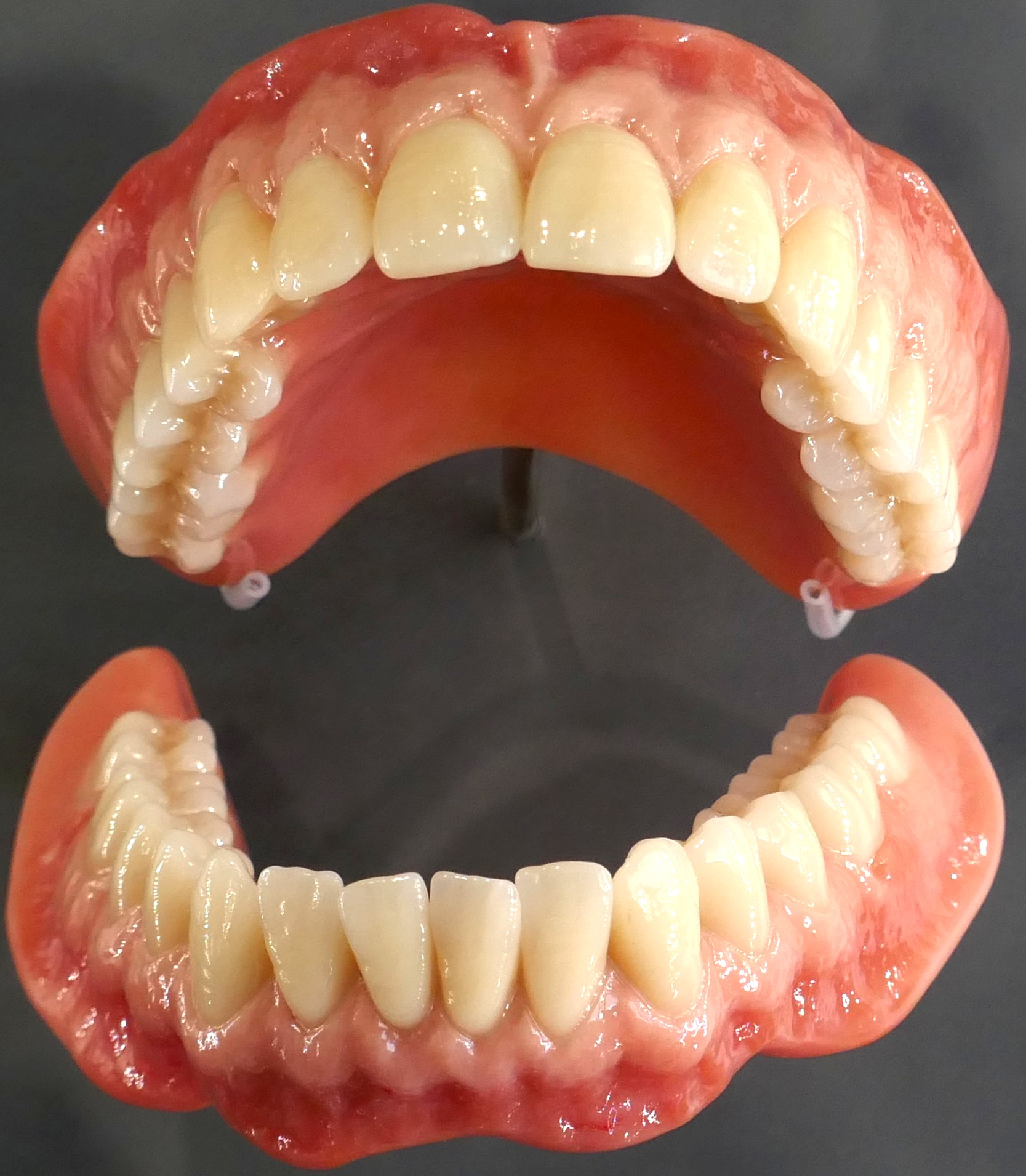

A complete denture (also known as a full denture, false teeth or plate) is a removable appliance used when all teeth within a jaw have been lost and need to be prosthetically replaced. In contrast to a partial denture, a complete denture is constructed when there are no more teeth left in an arch; hence, it is an exclusively tissue-supported prosthesis. A complete denture can be opposed by natural dentition, a partial or complete denture, fixed appliances or, sometimes, soft tissues.

== Epidemiology and causes of tooth loss ==
There has been a decline in both the prevalence and incidence of tooth loss within the last decades; people retain their natural dentition for longer. Nonetheless, there is still a great demand for complete dentures as more than 10% of adults aged 50–64 are completely edentulous, with age, smoking status and socioeconomic status being significant risk factors. Tooth loss can occur due to many reasons, such as:

- Dental caries
- Periodontal disease
- Trauma
- Congenital disorders (e.g. dentinogenesis imperfecta, molar incisor hypomineralisation)
- Parafunction

== Effects of tooth loss on oral tissues ==
Following the loss of teeth, there occurs a resorption (or loss) of alveolar bone, which continues throughout life. Although the rate of resorption varies, certain factors such as the magnitude of loading applied on the ridge, the technique of extraction and healing potential of the patient seem to affect this. The edentulous ridge can be classified according to the amount of bone in both the vertical and horizontal axes:

- Class I: dentate
- Class II: immediately post-extraction
- Class III: well-rounded ridge form, adequate in height and width
- Class IV: knife-edge ridge form, adequate in height and inadequate in width
- Class V: flat ridge form, inadequate in height and width
- Class VI: depressed ridge form, with some basilar loss evident

Alveolar bone resorption is an important consideration when designing complete dentures. In the absence of natural dentition, such dentures rely completely on soft tissues for their support. As a consequence, the forces exerted on the mucosa are significant and may, in turn, lead to an increased rate of bone resorption. Therefore, in order to ensure an equal distribution of forces across the mucosa, complete dentures should have maximum extensions.

Facial muscles on the cheeks and lips also lose their support as teeth are lost, contributing to an 'aged' appearance of the individual. Although complete dentures cannot prevent the loss in muscular tone (as they are not firmly attached to the skeletal system), they can nevertheless provide some artificial support to mask this loss in tone. Furthermore, perhaps the most noticeable effect of tooth loss from a patient perspective is the loss in masticatory (or chewing) efficiency. Teeth function to help with the chewing of food, breaking it down in small pieces that can be swallowed. Denture-wearing can bring some masticatory function back to normal. It cannot, however, fully compensate for the efficiency of the natural dentition because (1) dentures are not fixed in place like teeth are and so have to be actively controlled by the muscles and (2) biting forces are greatly reduced (about one-sixth of the natural dentition) as the dentures are impinging on soft tissues.

== Principles of complete dentures ==
Complete dentures are prone to a variety of displacing forces of differing magnitude as they are resting on oral mucosa and are in close proximity with tissues that are constantly changing due to the action of muscles. Consequently, for complete dentures to be retentive and stable, the retentive forces that hold the dentures in place must be greater than the ones aiming to displace it. Obtaining maximum stability and retention is one of the biggest challenges in full denture construction.

=== Retention ===
Retention in removable prosthodontics can be defined as the resistance to vertical dislodgment that can arise from either muscular forces or physical forces. It can be gained from three different surfaces of the denture:

1. Occlusal surface
2. Polished surface
3. Impression surface

==== Muscular control of the dentures ====
The peri-oral muscles (muscles of the cheeks and lips) can cause displacement of the dentures. Patients can, however, learn to control and coordinate their muscles so that the forces exerted are minimised or counter-acted to prevent such displacement. With age, the ability to learn new skills and acquire some level of neuromuscular control declines. Therefore, the "training" time-frame for patients to learn how to successfully use their new complete dentures is expected to be much longer for older patients.

== Transition into complete dentures ==
Many patients find the idea of wearing complete dentures very upsetting. Such psychological effects, together with the challenges that accompany successful prosthetic wear, can make acceptance of treatment difficult. It is, therefore, reasonable to consider different ways of transitioning into the edentate state in patients who have not yet lost all of their teeth but in which complete dentures will be required in the foreseeable future. Certain teeth can be retained in the short to medium-term with partial dentures provided in the interim so that the patient can become accustomed to denture wearing. Alternatively, if the former is not possible, consideration should be given to whether roots of teeth can be retained in strategic locations in the maxilla or mandible to help with the stability of the prostheses.

=== Transitional partial dentures ===
Teeth that can be restored despite a poor long-term prognosis may be retained to transition the patient into the edentulous state via a series of transitional partial dentures. It is important that the patient can maintain good plaque control during this period, as progression of periodontal disease will lead to further destruction of bone that will later become the foundation for denture support. Complete dentures require some level of muscular control from the patient (e.g. lifting tongue to stabilise upper denture on biting) and this process of adaptation can last for several weeks or even months. As patients age, the process of learning and memorising new skills as well as neuromuscular control (i.e. controlling when and how much muscles contract) becomes more challenging. Hence transitional partial dentures can provide a practice period for the musculature, before complete dentures are provided.

=== Overdentures ===
An overdenture is a prosthesis that fits over retained roots or implants in the jaws. Compared to conventional complete dentures, it provides a greater level of stability and support for the prosthesis. The mandibular (lower) jaw has significantly less surface area compared to the maxillary (upper) jaw; hence, retention of a lower prosthesis is greatly reduced. Consequently, mandibular overdentures are much more commonly prescribed than maxillary ones, where the palate often provides enough support for the plate.

==== Tooth supported ====
Retaining two or three natural teeth as retained roots can greatly improve the retention and stability of a complete denture, especially if the roots are fitted with special precision attachments. The process involves decoronation (removing the crown of the tooth) and elective root canal treatment of the overdenture abutments. For matters of simplicity for endodontic treatment provision, single-rooted anterior teeth are preferred, with the exception of lower incisors as they lack sufficient root surface area. If plaque control is satisfactory, tooth-supported overdentures can be considered as a long-term treatment option. Alternatively, if treatment fails, the roots can be extracted and the overdenture can easily be converted into a conventional complete denture.

===== Advantages =====
- Increased retention of prosthesis
- Reduced alveolar bone resorption and preservation of alveolar ridge
- Reduced horizontal forces
- Proprioception maintained
- Improved aesthetics (compared to partial dentures)

===== Disadvantages =====
- Requires endodontic (root canal) treatment of abutment teeth
- Predisposes to dental caries and periodontal disease

==== Implant supported ====
Although an implant-supported overdenture is not appropriate for the short-term transitioning stage into conventional complete dentures, it is an option that should be considered for the definitive treatment, given the higher stability and retention of such dentures. Despite complications, the success rate of dental implants is well established, with reports exceeding 98% in 20 years for mandibular anterior teeth. The provision of a two-implant supported overdenture in the mandibular (lower) edentulous jaw is now considered as the first choice of treatment, with patients reporting to have a significant improvement in quality of life and greater patient satisfaction when compared to conventional removable prostheses.

=== Immediate dentures ===
When clearance of the dentition is the only viable treatment option, immediate dentures can be constructed prior to the extractions and fitted once the teeth have been removed, at the same appointment. Such dentures help restore masticatory (chewing) function and aesthetics whilst at the same time allowing a period for the soft tissues to heal and the bone levels to stabilise before constructing the definitive complete dentures.

==== Advantages ====
- Restoration of aesthetics and masticatory function
- Allow for time of adaptation as the patient gets used to their new dentures
- Psychosocial advantages
- Protection of wound area following extractions
- Allow clinician to transfer jaw relationship and aesthetics from natural teeth onto immediate dentures. If immediate dentures are not provided, then following extraction of the teeth such information will be lost; hence it prevents later 'guesswork'.

==== Disadvantages ====
- Unpredictable fit and aesthetics – the dentures are constructed before all teeth are removed in a jaw; therefore, there is some level of guesswork involved with respect to tooth placement and the fitting surface of the denture.
- Limited lifespan of prosthesis and relines often required – as the tissues heal following extractions, the alveolar bone starts to resorb causing the tissues to recede. Consequently, immediate dentures will require some level of maintenance, with relines of the fit surface and/or occlusal adjustments.

== Relevance of existing dentures ==
In many circumstances patients will already have a set of dentures that will require replacing for various reasons (e.g. recession of alveolar bone causing loss of fit of prosthesis, broken dentures, etc.). Whether or not they are deemed satisfactory by the wearer or clinician, existing dentures can provide invaluable information for the construction of a new set.

== Anatomy of the denture-bearing areas ==
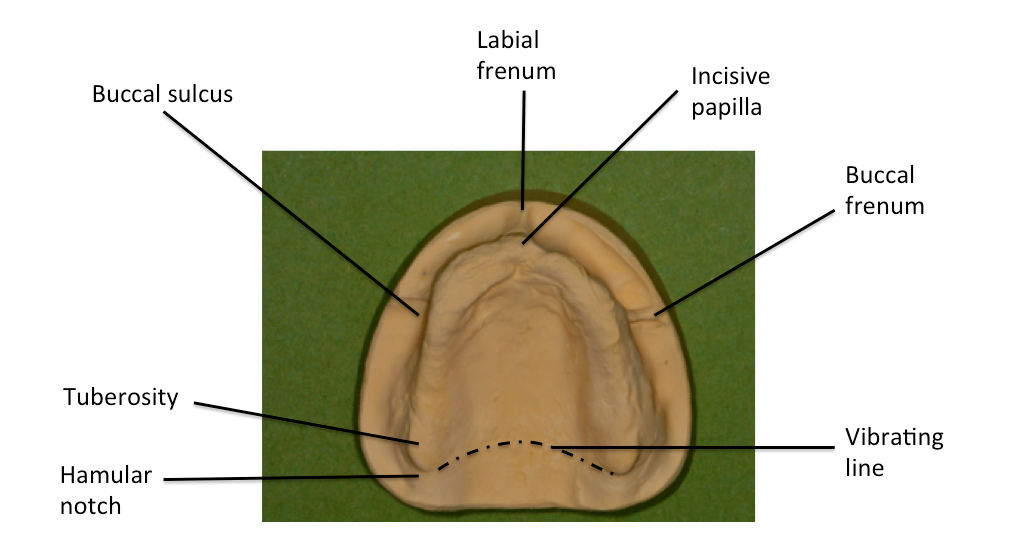
Surface anatomy of maxillary denture-bearing area

=== Extensions ===
- Maxillary (upper) complete denture posterior extension: vibrating line (i.e. the intersection between the soft and hard palate). The landmarks for the vibrating line are the fovea palatinae (collecting ducts of minor salivary glands) that can be seen as two concavities on the mucosa. Extending the maxillary denture to the vibrating line ensures maximum extension for retention, while at the same time it excludes the movable tissues of the soft palate that would cause instability.
- Mandibular (lower) complete denture posterior extension: pear-shaped pads (act as tissue stops to prevent horizontal displacement of denture)
- Functional depth of sulcus (determined by border moulding) for optimum retention

=== Relevant anatomical structures ===
There are several anatomical structures that have the potential to cause displacement of the complete dentures. These are:

- Mentalis muscle – the effects of this muscle are more evident when there has been considerable alveolar bone resorption in the mandibular (lower) jaw. As the mentalis muscle contracts, it can cause displacement of the prosthesis in a posterior and upward fashion
- Masseter muscle
- Floor of mouth
- Zygomatic process of maxilla – over-extension in the sulcus around the maxillary molar region can cause mucosal trauma as the tissues are trapped between the prosthesis and the zygomatic process of the maxilla
- Coronoid process – on opening of the mandible, the coronoid process can impinge on the denture if the flange on the posterior aspect is too wide. This will either result in displacement of the prosthesis or restriction of mouth opening
- Incisive papillae on the maxillary arch remains relatively constant in position during alveolar bone resorption and remodelling, and can, therefore, be used to mark the midline of the upper jaw and facilitate placement of prosthetic teeth.

== Construction of complete dentures: clinical stages ==
=== Impressions ===
Similarly to all removable prostheses, the first step in denture construction is to obtain accurate impressions of the soft tissues. As the height of the ridge will vary throughout the arch, two sets of impressions are taken. The primary (or preliminary) impressions, taken using a stock tray (preformed) and a suitable impression material, are used to construct special trays. Special trays are made in either acrylic or shellac and have a shape that corresponds to the shape of the mucosa of the individual patient. This way, it is ensured that during secondary (or master) impressions there will be a uniform thickness of impression material throughout the tray.

==== Primary (preliminary) impressions ====
Although stock trays (metallic or plastic) come in different sizes, it is very likely that some parts will be over- or under-extended and therefore have to be modified prior to impression-taking to ensure that the entirety of the mucosa is recorded accurately. Greenstick or silicone putty can be used to extend the trays if they are under-extended; this is of vital importance, as any unsupported impression material may distort until the impressions are cast. A suitable material such as alginate can be used for this purpose.

==== Secondary (master or working) impressions ====
As described above, special trays (acrylic or shellac) ensure that the secondary impressions accurately record the tissues whilst ensuring a uniform thickness of impression material throughout the tray. Different impression materials will have different thickness requirements. Alginate, for example, requires a thickness of at least 3 mm to prevent distortion whereas the more elastic silicone materials can be used in thickness of 1–2 mm. Therefore, when special trays are constructed, it is the responsibility of the prescribing clinician to ask for the appropriate level of spacing between the tray and the tissues.

Another feature which should be incorporated into special trays is tissue stops, which can be described as 2–3 mm wide extensions on the impression surface of the special tray. Without the incorporation of tissue stops, when the special tray is tried in the mouth to check for the accuracy of extensions, it will appear over-extended as the laboratory has extended the tray in a way that will allow the specified thickness of impression material to be accommodated. Tissue stops allow the clinician to appropriately assess the extensions of the tray.

The impression materials that can be used with special trays are:

1. Zinc oxide eugenol impression paste
2. Impression plaster
3. Addition silicones
4. Condensation silicones
5. Polysulphide
6. Polyether

==== Border moulding ====
Border moulding refers to the functional or manual manipulation of the cheeks and lips in order to mould the borders of the impression to that of the functional depth of the sulcus and floor of mouth. This is necessary to ensure stability and adequate retention of the complete dentures. The following steps can be carried out during impression-taking:

- Lower impression: ask patient to raise tongue to contact upper lip and move it to the right and left cheek
- Firmly pull and relax the cheeks and lips
- The tray should be supported by the clinician throughout the moulding

==== Mucostatic and mucocompressive (mucodisplacive) impression techniques ====
There are two ways in which the soft tissues can be recorded during impression taking:

1. Mucostatic impression records the soft tissues in their resting state, thus no or minimal pressure is applied during impression-taking. This technique has the advantage of ensuring a close adaptation of the denture base to the entirety of the mucosa and hence enhancing retention. Due to the fact that the mucosa is uneven in compressibility, however, there will inevitably be an uneven distribution of loads during masticatory function. An impression material of low viscosity (e.g. impression paste, alginate or light body silicone) is selected for this technique.
2. A mucocompressive impression is obtained by applying some pressure to the soft tissues during impression-taking, thus recording the shape of the soft tissues under masticatory loading (functional impression technique, i.e. the force is applied by asking the patient to bite down on the impression tray). Consequently, the mucosa will have an even distribution of loads during function, but the retention of the denture is adversely affected as it inhibits a close adaptation of the denture base to the mucosa in the resting position, which occurs during the majority of time. Such a technique, however, can be considered in patients with a history of mucosal trauma and discomfort (particularly in the lower jaw). Suitable materials for this purpose include high-viscosity silicone impression materials.

The ultimate goal of complete dentures is to maintain oral health and function. Complete dentures should be comfortable for the individual while also improving aesthetics and psychological well-being.

To achieve these goals, it is important to obtain an accurate impression in order to design and create a denture that has adequate retention and stability.

Denture-related problems can be linked to dentist-related factors, patient-related factors or processing errors. The most common denture-related problems include insufficient retention and improper jaw relations. These are both related to the final-impression technique and the material used to create the dentures.

A Cochrane Review in 2018 comparing final impression techniques and materials for making complete dentures concluded that further high-quality research is required as there was no clear evidence to suggest that one technique or material had a significant advantage over another.

=== Bite registration ===
Once the impressions have been cast, a set of models has been produced that provide the clinician and dental technician with a replica of the upper and lower jaws with which to work in order to produce the final complete denture. An integral part to the construction is to record how the patient is or should be biting, (i.e. the spatial relationship between the maxilla and the mandible) as well as recording all the necessary information for the next stage, the wax try-in.

==== Occlusal vertical dimension, resting vertical dimension and freeway space ====
When setting up the teeth during construction of complete dentures, the clinician must decide a vertical height on which the patient will be biting upon; this is termed the occlusal vertical dimension (OVD). This task is particularly challenging in complete dentures, as there is no existing occlusion to which the clinician can reference to, and as a result, it is the cause of many errors in complete denture construction. The resting vertical dimension (RVD) may be defined as the vertical dimension between two points, one on the maxilla and one on the mandible, when the patient's muscles are at a relaxed position. The difference between OVD and RVD is termed the Freeway space (FWS). This distance should be between 2–4 mm.

In an edentate patient, the OVD cannot be measured unless it was recorded prior to clearance of the dentition or pre-existing dentures provide a satisfactory value. In the majority of cases, however, the OVD needs to be calculated by determining the RVD and allowing for adequate FWS (i.e. OVD = RVD - FWS = RVD - (2 to 4 mm)). The patient is asked to relax the muscles of the mandible, and the measurement for RVD is taken with a Willis gauge from a point on the chin and a point underneath the nose.

==== The record (bite) blocks ====
Record blocks are made in such a way so that the dental technician is provided with all the information necessary to provide a wax replica of the dentures. They consist of blocks of wax resting on a rigid base that can be made out of shellac, light-cured or heat-cured acrylic. The base can sometimes be made out of wax; however, such a material lacks the rigidity required to ensure accurate measures are taken. Additionally, it may distort during transport and thus damage the validity of the recordings. Acrylic resins demonstrate the best accuracy of fit and are therefore the most retentive, with heat-cured acrylic being superior to light-cured.

The record blocks are inserted in the mouth and the following should be examined and deemed satisfactory prior to proceeding with any adjustments:

- Retention
- Extensions
- Stability
- Comfort

===== Adjusting the upper record block =====
- Orientation of occlusal plane – using either a wooden spatula or a more sophisticated Fox's occlusal plane indicator, the orientation of the upper occlusal plane should be parallel to both the ala-tragal line and the interpupillary line.
- Level of occlusal plane – the block should be trimmed or added onto so that the height of the rim is aesthetically pleasing to the amount of wax shown when the patient is at rest (block should be just visible) and when the patient is asked to smile (a few mm should be visible incisally). A more thorough assessment can be performed by asking the patient to say a few sentences while the clinician concentrates on how much of the record block is visible. Such adjustments will guide the dental technician to the position and length of teeth to be incorporated in the dentures.
- Shaping of the buccal surfaces to ensure adequate lip and cheek support
  - Naso-labial angle 102–116°
- Shaping of the palatal surface to ensure adequate tongue space
- Mark midline, canine line and smile line

===== Adjusting the lower record block =====
- Conforming to the height of desired OVD by either adding onto or removing wax from the block
- Relationship of the buccal and lingual surfaces to the neutral zone

==== Recording the centric occlusion ====
Centric occlusion refers to teeth contact when the jaws are in centric relation (when the condyles are in the uppermost and foremost position in the glenoid fossa and when muscles are in their most relaxed state). It is sometimes referred to as the retruded jaw relationship.
