= VDO =

VDO may refer to:

- VDO (company), a German automotive parts producer
- Vertical dimension of occlusion, in dentistry
- Vincent D'Onofrio (born 1959), actor
- Virtual Data Optimization, a feature of Red Hat Enterprise Linux 7.5
- Van Don International Airport, the IATA code VDO

== See also ==
- Video
