= Full mouth extraction =

Full mouth extraction is a dental procedure involving the extraction of all teeth from both upper and lower jaws. Full mouth extraction involving both healthy and broken or diseased teeth for prophylactic reasons was common in some countries in the first half of the 20th century but is now rare due to the negative effects associated with total loss of teeth such as a reduction in thickness of the jaw ridge and changes in face shape.

== History ==
=== Australia ===
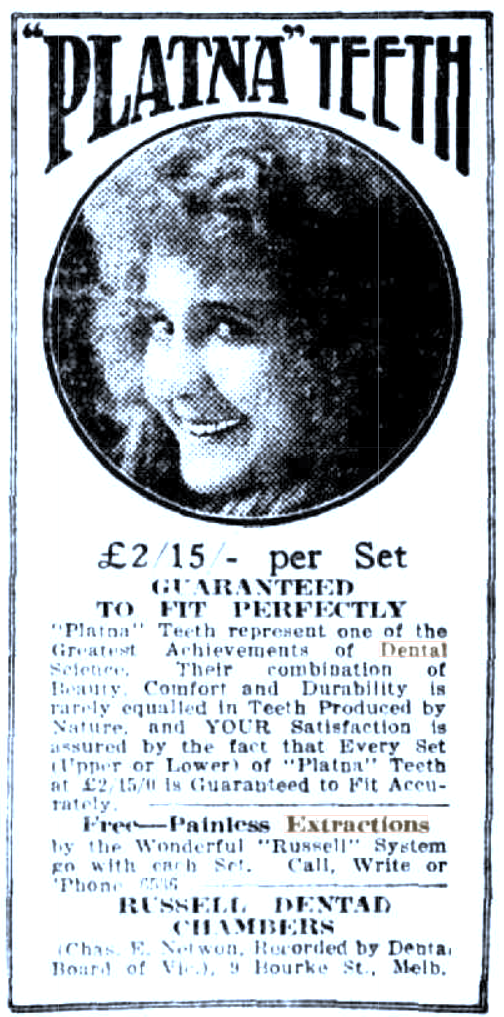
1918 Advertisement

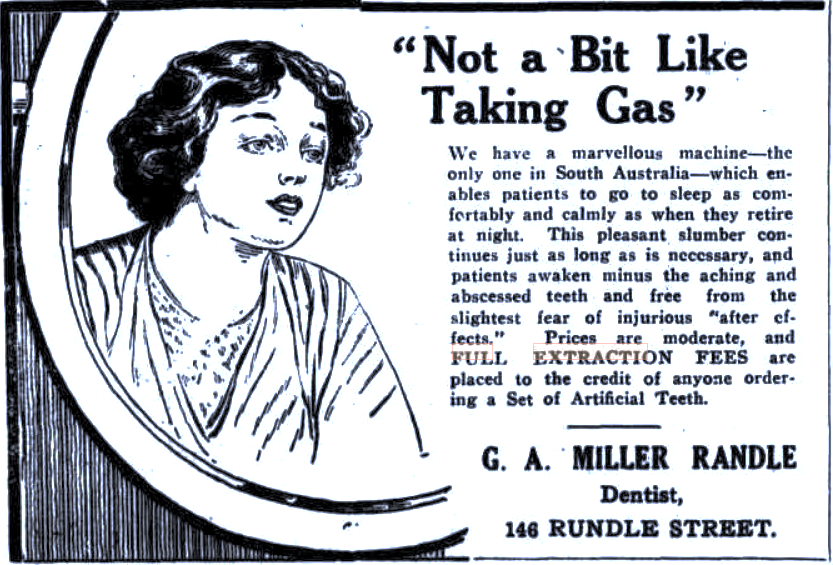
Dental anaesthesia

In the first few decades of the twentieth century it was not unusual for parents to give their unmarried children the expense of a total extraction, and replacement with a set of dentures, as a twenty-first birthday present. It was a gift of lifetime improved health, reliability in employment, and economy, particularly for the majority of the population who were perhaps many days' travel from a major centre. For instance,

- A drover would prefer to employ riders who were not likely to be incapacitated through infected gums. (Note: Len Beadell, who employed a team of workers when surveying the Gunbarrel Highway and other outback roads, learned to extract teeth and carried the requisite tools and pain killers when many days' travel from population centres.)

Unlike other medical emergencies, dental problems do not often heal themselves or result in death, but must be treated otherwise endured indefinitely. Dentures also present a more acceptable appearance than a mouthful of broken, diseased or missing teeth.

For the same reasons, daughters might have been given a full mouth extraction as an engagement present, when this occurred before her 21st birthday, which was common.

The process was made possible by improvements in local and general anaesthesia.

== Other benefits ==
- Lifetime reduction in diseases of maxillary sinus
- Lifetime reduction in periodontal disease

== See also ==
- Full mouth disinfection
