= Toothlessness =

Lacking teeth

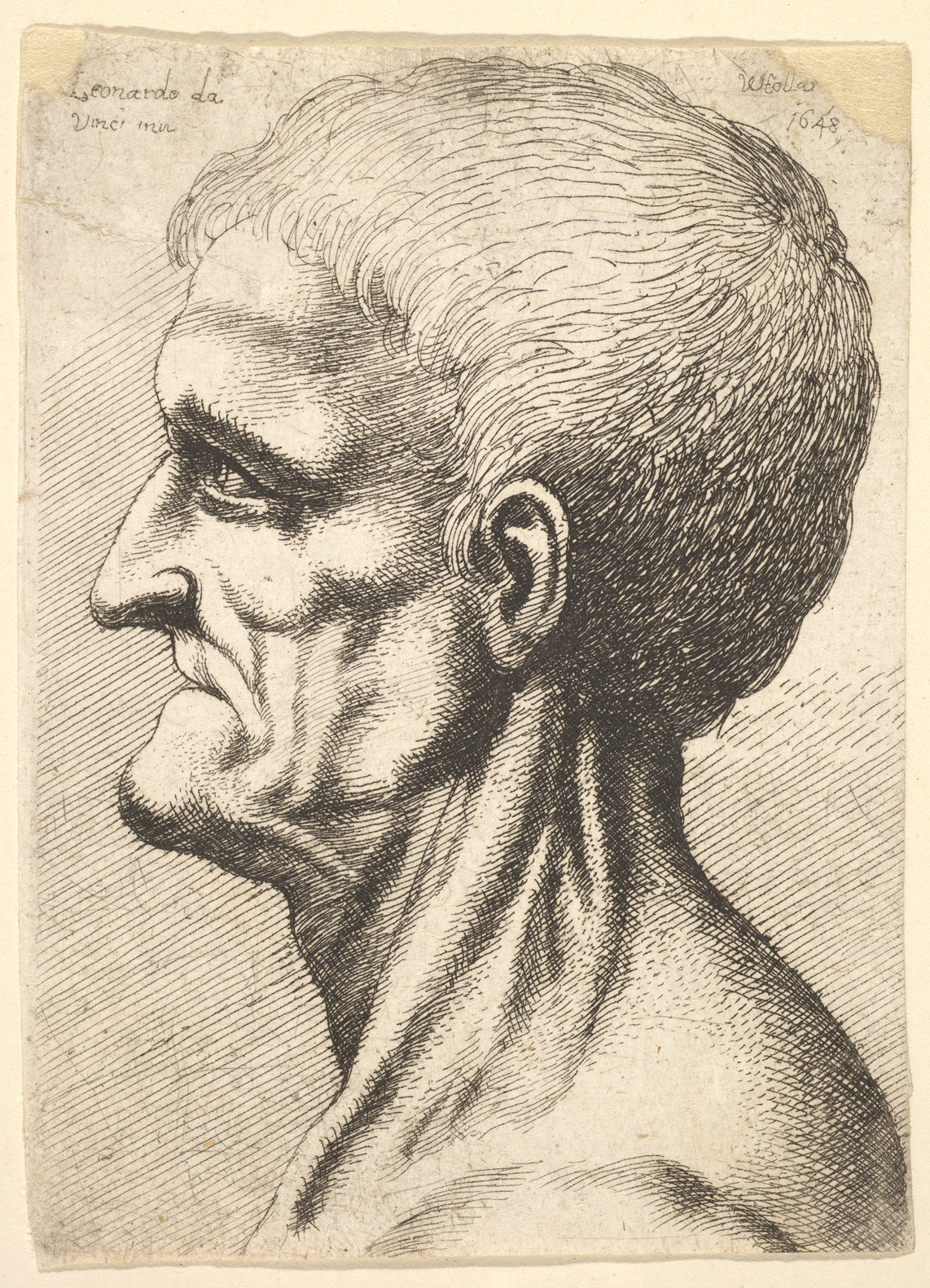
A toothless man drawn by Leonardo da Vinci

Toothlessness or edentulism is the condition of having no teeth. In organisms that naturally have teeth, it is the result of tooth loss. Organisms that never possessed teeth can also be described as edentulous. Examples are the members of the former zoological classification order of Edentata, which included anteaters and sloths, as they possess no anterior teeth and no or poorly developed posterior teeth.

In naturally dentate species, edentulism is more than just the simple presence or absence of teeth. It is biochemically complex because the teeth, jaws, and oral mucosa are dynamic. Processes such as bone remodeling (loss and gain of bone tissue) in the jaws and inflammation of soft tissue in response to the oral microbiota are clinically important for edentulous people. For example, bone resorption in the jaw is frequently how the teeth were able to detach in the first place. The jaw in an edentulous area undergoes further resorption even after the teeth are gone; and the insertion of dental implants can elicit new bone formation, leading to osseointegration. Meanwhile, bacteria and yeasts of the oral cavity and the immune system of their host create an immensely complicated and constantly changing interplay that presents clinically as gingivitis, caries, stomatitis, and other periodontal pathology.

Tooth regeneration is an ongoing stem cell–based field of study that aims to find methods to reverse the effects of decay; current methods are based on easing symptoms.

== Signs and symptoms ==
In humans, teeth serve to:

- support the lips and cheeks, providing for a fuller, more aesthetically pleasing appearance
- maintain an individual's vertical dimension of occlusion
- along with the tongue and lips, allow for the proper pronunciation of various sounds
- preserve and maintain the height of the alveolar ridge
- cut, grind, and otherwise chew food

Beyond impairing physical function, tooth loss also has a psychological impact: it has been shown to generally lower a patient's quality of life, with this compromised oral function leading to decreased self-esteem and a decline in psychological well-being. Patients may be embarrassed to smile, eat and talk.

=== Facial support and aesthetics ===
When an individual's mouth is at rest, the teeth in the opposing jaws are nearly touching; there is what is referred to as a "freeway space" of roughly 2–3 mm. However, this distance is partially maintained as a result of the teeth limiting any further closure past the point of maximum intercuspidation. When there are no teeth present in the mouth, the natural vertical dimension of occlusion is lost and the mouth has a tendency to overclose. This causes the cheeks to exhibit a "sunken-in" appearance and wrinkle lines to form at the commissures. Additionally, the anterior teeth, when present, serve to properly support the lips and provide for certain aesthetic features, such as an acute nasiolabial angle. Loss of muscle tone and skin elasticity due to old age, when most individuals begin to experience edentulism, tend to further exacerbate this condition.

The tongue, which consists of a very dynamic group of muscles, tends to fill the space it is allowed, and in the absence of teeth, will broaden out. This makes it initially difficult to fabricate both complete dentures and removable partial dentures for patients exhibiting complete and partial edentulism, respectively; however, once the space is "taken back" by the prosthetic teeth, the tongue will return to a narrower body.

=== Vertical dimension of occlusion ===
As stated, the position of maximal closure in the presence of teeth is referred to as maximum intercuspidation, and the vertical jaw relationship in this position is referred to as the vertical dimension of occlusion. With the loss of teeth, there is a decrease in this vertical dimension, as the mouth is allowed to overclose when there are no teeth present to block the further upward movement of the mandible towards the maxilla. This may contribute, as explained above, to a sunken-in appearance of the cheeks, because there is now "too much" cheek than is needed to extend from the maxilla to the mandible when in an over closed position. If this situation is left untreated for many years, the muscles and tendons of the mandible and the TMJ may manifest with altered tone and elasticity.

=== Pronunciation ===
The teeth play a major role in speech. Some letter sounds require the lips and/or tongue to make contact with teeth for proper pronunciation of the sound, and lack of teeth will obviously affect the way in which an edentulous individual can pronounce these sounds.

For example, the consonant sounds of the English language s, z, j, x ,d, n, l, t, and th are achieved with tongue-to-tooth contact; the fricatives f and v are achieved through lip-to-tooth contact. The edentulous individual finds these sounds very difficult to enunciate properly.

=== Preservation of alveolar ridge height ===
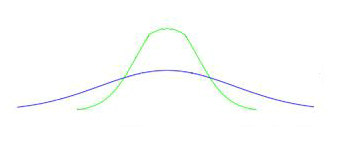
The green line indicates the faciolingual dimensions of a newly edentulous ridge, while the blue line indicates these dimensions after the occurrence of very severe resorption.

The alveolar ridges are columns of bone that surround and anchor the teeth and run the entire length, mesiodistally, of both the maxillary and mandibular dental arches. The alveolar bone is unique in that it exists for the sake of the teeth that it retains; when the teeth are absent, the bone slowly resorbs. The maxilla resorbs in a superioposterior direction, and the mandible resorbs in an inferioanterior direction, thus eventually converting an individual's occlusal scheme from a Class I to a Class III. Loss of teeth alters the form of the alveolar bone in 91% of cases.

In addition to this resorption of bone in the vertical and anterioposterior dimensions, the alveolus also resorbs faciolingually, thus diminishing the width of the ridge. What initially began as a tall bell curve (in the faciolingual dimension) eventually becomes much shorter and broader. Resorption is exacerbated by pressure on the bone; thus, long-term complete denture wearers will experience more drastic reductions to their ridges than non-denture wearers. Those individuals who do wear dentures can decrease the amount of bone loss by retaining some tooth roots in the form of overdenture abutments or have implants placed. Note that the depiction above shows a very excessive change caused by year of denture usage.

Ridge resorption may also alter the form of the ridges to less predictable shapes, such as bulbous ridges with undercuts or even sharp, thin, knife-edged ridges, depending on the many possible factors that influenced the resorption.

Bone loss with missing teeth, partials and complete dentures is progressive. According to Wolff's law, bone is stimulated, strengthened and continually renewed directly by a tooth or an implant. Teeth and implants provide this direct stimulation which develops stronger bone around them.

A 1970 research study of 1012 patients by Jozewicz showed denture wearers had a significantly higher rate of bone loss. Tallgren's 25-year study in 1972 also showed denture wearers have continued bone loss over the years. The biting force on the gum tissue irritates the bone and it undergoes resorption with a decrease in volume and density. Carlsson's 1967 study showed a significant bone loss during the first year after a tooth extraction which continues over the years, even without a denture or partial on it.

Effects on jawline and facial structure due to complete edentulism

The longer people are missing teeth, wear dentures or partials, the less bone they have in their jaws. This may result in decreased ability to chew food well, a decreased quality of life, social insecurity and decreasing esthetics because of a collapsing of the lower third of their face.

The bone loss also results in a significant decrease in chewing force, prompting many denture and partial wearers to avoid certain kinds of food. Collection of food particles under the appliance may inadvertently affect the patients choice of food. There are several reports that correlate the quality and length of peoples lives with their ability to chew.

Dental implant studies from 1977 by Branemark and countless others show dental implants stop this progressive loss and stabilize the bone over the long term. . Dental implants provide good Osseointegration and are hence stable and are often associated with better ease of use and an improved quality of life than traditional dentures.

=== Masticatory efficiency ===
Physiologically, teeth provide for greater chewing ability. Teeth allow humans to masticate food thoroughly, increasing the surface area necessary to allow for the enzymes present in the saliva, as well as in the stomach and intestines, to digest the food. Chewing also allows food to be prepared into small boli that are more readily swallowed than inconsistent chunks of different sizes. For those who are even partially edentulous, it may become extremely difficult to chew food efficiently enough to swallow comfortably, although this is entirely dependent upon which teeth are lost. When an individual loses enough posterior teeth to make it difficult to chew, he or she may need to cut their food into very small pieces and learn how to make use of their anterior teeth to chew. If enough posterior teeth are missing, this will not only affect their chewing abilities, but also their occlusion; posterior teeth, in a mutually protected occlusion, help to protect the anterior teeth and the vertical dimension of occlusion and, when missing, the anterior teeth begin to bear a greater amount of force than they are structurally prepared for. Thus, loss of posterior teeth will cause the anterior teeth to splay. This can be prevented by obtaining dental prostheses, such as removable partial dentures, bridges or implant-supported crowns. In addition to reestablishing a protected occlusion, these prostheses can greatly improve one's chewing abilities.

As a consequence of a lack of certain nutrition due to altered eating habits, various health problems can occur, from the mild to the extreme. Lack of certain vitamins (A, E and C) and low levels of riboflavin and thiamin can produce a variety of conditions, ranging from constipation, weight loss, arthritis and rheumatism. There are more serious conditions such as heart disease and Parkinson's disease and even to the extreme, certain types of cancer. Treatments include changing approaches to eating such as cutting food in advance to make eating easier and less likely to avoid as well as consumer health products such as multivitamins and multi-minerals which aid in fulfilling the nutritional deficit found in denture users.

Numerous studies linking edentulism with instances of disease and medical conditions have been reported. In a cross-sectional study, Hamasha and others found significant differences between edentulous and dentate individuals with respect to rates of atherosclerotic vascular disease, heart failure, ischemic heart disease and joint disease.

== Cause ==
Edentulism is a condition which can have multiple causes. In exceedingly rare cases, toothlessness may result from the teeth not developing in the first place (anodontia). However, in most cases it is as a result of permanent tooth extraction in adulthood. This may or may not be due to dental caries, periodontal disease (gum disease), trauma or other pathology of the face and mouth (i.e. cysts, tumours). In those under 45 years of age, dental caries is considered to be the main cause of toothlessness, whereas periodontal disease is the primary cause of tooth loss in older age groups.

As people age, their permanent teeth are exposed to normal mechanical forces such as chewing, as well as abnormal forces caused by bruxism and traumatic injuries. Plaque buildup and the presence of bacteria also affect the gums and bone tissue, as well as their ability to hold the teeth in place. Unevenly worn or misaligned teeth are more likely to become loose or damaged, and when combined with an increased risk of gum disease, the likelihood of losing more teeth rises sharply

== Replacing missing teeth ==
There are three main ways in which missing teeth can be replaced:

- Bridges: Used to replace one or more missing teeth. False teeth are supported by the remaining, adjacent natural teeth.
  - Advantages:
    - They are fixed, they do not require removal on a frequent basis. Therefore, they are easily maintained.
    - Can be cleaned by normal brushing procedures.
    - Unlike dentures, they do not require skill in their use. They will not move about.
  - Disadvantages:
    - They generally require the preparation of adjacent teeth. This is destructive and not required for the placement of a denture.
    - They have a higher rate of failure than either Dentures or Implants.
- Dentures: False teeth are mounted onto an acrylic base. These may be partial (to replace some missing teeth) or complete (where all the natural teeth are missing). Dentures may be removable, or fixed in the mouth by dental implants.
  - Advantages:
    - This is the least expensive option for the replacement of teeth.
    - The least invasive, no surgery needed (usually).
  - Disadvantages:
    - Quite often rely solely on the mucosa for support, do not tend to be as stable as the other options.
    - Very difficult to keep clean and can exacerbate any oral hygiene issues.
    - They are difficult to learn to use. Quite often require complex muscular control to hold them in place.
    - Not as efficient as other options. Foods such as apples and nuts will often have to be avoided.
- Dental Implants: To replace a single tooth, a screw (the implant) is placed into the jaw bone, which a false tooth is screwed onto. Implants can also be used to support bridges or dentures.
  - Advantages:
    - They are much more realistic than the other options. They have similar efficiency and aesthetics to an actual tooth.
    - They do not require the destruction of the adjacent teeth like bridges.
    - They last 5-8 times longer than both bridges and dentures. Despite the initial higher cost, it pays off in the long term.
    - Much easier to maintain, with oral hygiene procedures being rather similar to an actual tooth.
  - Disadvantages:
    - Cost: they are very expensive. A single implant will cost between £2000-3000 on average.
    - Surgery: Their placement requires quite invasive surgery. With surgery comes risks (e.g. infection, swelling, bleeding).
    - Replacement: The actual implant itself rarely requires replacement, but the actual abutment, or tooth sitting on top of the implant will. This needs replacing on average every 10–15 years.
    - Time: Once an implant has been placed, the tooth replacement does not occur immediately. Implants take time for bone integration. The majority require 3 to 6 months before the final restoration is placed.

== Clinical classification ==
A classification system has been developed by the American College of Prosthodontists. The classification are based on diagnostic findings, which is used to help practitioners determine appropriate treatments for patients.

The diagnostic criteria used to classify edentulism are:

- Location and extent of the edentulous areas
- Condition of abutment teeth
- Occlusal scheme
- Residual ridge

There are four categories which are Class I, II, III and IV.

- Class I: Minimally compromised

This class is most likely to be successfully treated with complete dentures. The characteristics include:

- Residual bone height of 21mm or more measured at the lowest vertical height of the mandible shown on a panoramic radiograph.
- Residual ridge morphology resists horizontal and vertical movement of the denture base
- Location of muscle attachments that arc conducive to denture base stability and retention
- Class I maxillomandibular relationship.
- Class II: Moderately compromised

This class is distinguished by the continued degradation of the denture‐supporting anatomy. It is also characterised by specific patient management and lifestyle considerations as well as systemic disease interactions. Characteristics include:

- Residual bone height of 16 to 20mrn measured at the lowest vertical height of the mandible on a panoramic radiograph.
- Residual ridge morphology that does not show horizontal and vertical movement of the denture base.
- Location of muscle attachments with limited influence on denture base stability and retention.
- Class I maxillomandibular relationship.
- Minor modifiers, psychosocial considerations, mild systemic disease with oral manifestation.
- Class III: Substantially compromised

This classification level is where surgical revision of supporting structures is needed to allow for adequate prosthodontic function.

- Residual alveolar bone height of 11 to 15mm measured at the least vertical height of the mandible on a panoramic radiograph.
- Residual ridge morphology has minimum influence to resist horizontal or vertical movement of the denture base.
- Location of muscle attachments with moderate influence on denture base stability and retention.
- Class I, II or III maxillomandibular relationship.

The conditions that need preprosthetic surgery include:

1. minor soft tissue procedures
2. minor hard tissue procedures including alveoloplasty
3. simple implant placement, no augmentation required
4. multiple extractions leading to complete edentulism for immediate denture placement.
- Class IV: Severely compromised

This classification level depicts the most debilitated edentulous condition. Surgical reconstruction is almost always indicated but cannot always be accomplished because of the patient's health, preferences, dental history, and financial considerations. When surgical revision is not an option, prosthodontic techniques of a specialized nature must be used to achieve an adequate treatment outcome.

- Residual vertical bone height of 10mm or less measured at the least vertical height of the mandible on a panoramic radiograph.
- Residual ridge offers no resistance to horizontal or vertical movement.
- Muscle attachment location that can be expected to have significant influence on denture base stability and retention.
- Class I, II, or III maxillomandibular relationships.
- History of paresthesia or dysesthesia.

Major conditions requiring preprosthetic surgery

1. complex implant placement, augmentation required
2. surgical correction of dentofacial deformities
3. hard tissue augmentation required
4. major soft tissue revision required, i.e., vestibular extensions with or without soft tissue grafting.

== Epidemiology ==
Disability-adjusted life year for edentulism per 100,000 inhabitants in 2004. no data less than 30 30–35 35–40 40–45 45–50 50–60 60–65 65–70 70–75 75–80 80–85 more than 85

Edentulism affects approximately 158 million people globally as of 2010 (2.3% of the population). It is more common in women at 2.7% compared to the male rate of 1.9%.

A cross-sectional analysis of data from the Survey of Health, Ageing and Retirement in Europe (SHARE) from 14 European countries (Austria, Belgium, Czech Republic, Denmark, Estonia, France, Germany, Italy, Luxembourg, the Netherlands, Slovenia, Spain, Sweden, and Switzerland) and Israel showed substantial variation in the age-standardized mean numbers of natural teeth amongst people aged 50 years and older, ranging from 14.3 teeth (Estonia) to 24.5 teeth (Sweden). The oral health goal of retaining at least 20 teeth at age 80 years was achieved by 25% of the population or less in most countries. A target concerning edentulism (≤15% in population aged 65–74 years) was reached in Sweden, Switzerland, Denmark, France, and Germany. Tooth replacement practices varied especially for a number of up to five missing teeth which were more likely to be replaced in Austria, Germany, Luxembourg, and Switzerland than in Israel, Denmark, Estonia, Spain, and Sweden.

The prevalence of Kennedy Class III partial denture was predominant among younger population of 21-30 year and 31–40 years, whereas in group III between 41 and 50 years Class I was predominant. It can be stated that the need for prosthodontics care is expected to increase with age, and hence, more efforts should be made for improving dental education and motivation among patients.

Edentulism occurs more often in people from the lower end of the socioeconomic scale.

== Society and culture ==
It is estimated that tooth loss results in worldwide productivity losses in the size of about US$63 billion yearly.
