= Denture-related stomatitis =

- Other names: Denture sore mouth, denture stomatitis, chronic atrophic candidiasis, Candida-associated denture induced stomatitis, and denture-associated erythematous stomatitis)
- Specialty: Dentistry

Denture-related stomatitis is a common condition where mild inflammation and redness of the oral mucous membrane occurs beneath a denture. In about 90% of cases, Candida species are involved, which are normally a harmless component of the oral microbiota in many people. Denture-related stomatitis is the most common form of oral candidiasis (a yeast infection of the mouth). It is more common in elderly people, and in those who wear a complete upper denture (a denture which replaces all the upper teeth, worn by someone with no natural teeth in their upper jaw). Denture-related stomatitis is more likely to develop when the denture is left constantly in the mouth, rather than removing it during sleep, and when the denture is not cleaned regularly.

== Signs and symptoms ==
Despite the alternative name for this condition, "denture sore mouth", it is usually painless and asymptomatic. The appearance of the involved mucosa is erythematous (red) and edematous (swollen), sometimes with petechial hemorrhage (pin-points of bleeding). This usually occurs beneath an upper denture. Sometimes angular cheilitis can coexist, which is inflammation of the corners of the mouth, also often associated with Candida albicans. Stomatitis rarely develops under a lower denture. The affected mucosa is often sharply defined, in the shape of the covering denture.

== Causes ==
The major risk factor for the development of this condition is wearing an upper complete denture, particularly when it is not removed during sleep and cleaned regularly. Older dentures are more likely to be involved. Other factors include xerostomia (dry mouth), diabetes or a high carbohydrate diet. Human immunodeficiency virus (HIV) can rarely be an underlying factor.

Wearing dental appliances such as dentures alters the oral microbiota. A microbial plaque composed of bacteria and/or yeasts forms on the fitting surface of the denture (the surface which rests against the palate) and on the mucosa which is covered. Over time, this plaque may be colonized by Candida species. The local environment under a denture is more acidic and less exposed to the cleansing action of saliva, which favors high Candida enzymatic activity and may cause inflammation in the mucosa. C. albicans is the most commonly isolated organism, but occasionally bacteria are implicated.

There is controversy as to whether this condition represents a true infection by C. albicans or just a reaction to the various micro-organisms present underneath a denture. It has been reported that often the surface of the denture shows positive culture for Candida but biopsies of the mucosa rarely show hyphae invading epithelium. Similarly, microbiologic swabs of the involved mucosa show a much less heavy colonization than the surface of the denture. This has led some to conclude that the defining feature of a true infection is absent in denture-related stomatitis.

Poorly fitting dentures may cause pressure on the mucosa and mechanical irritation may create a similar clinical appearance, but this is uncommon. An orthodontic appliance may uncommonly produce a similar result. However, mucosal trauma is thought increase the ability of C. albicans to invade the tissues.

Aside from infection and mechanical trauma, inflammatory reactions of the mucosa beneath a denture can also result from irritation or allergy (allergic contact stomatitis) caused by the materials in the denture itself (acrylic, cobalt, chromium), or in response to substances within denture adhesives. Incomplete curing of the acrylic resin (the prosthetic material) may also be an involved factor.

== Diagnosis ==
The diagnosis is usually made based upon the clinical appearance, and swabs can be taken of the surface of the denture. Investigations to rule out possibility of diabetes may be indicated. Tissue biopsy is not usually indicated, but if taken shows histologic evidence of proliferative or degenerative responses and reduced keratinization and epithelial atrophy.

=== Classification ===
The Newton classification divides denture-related stomatitis into three types based on severity. Type one may represent an early stage of the condition, whilst type two is the most common and type three is uncommon.

- Type 1 - Localized inflammation or pinpoint hyperemia
- Type 2 - More diffuse erythema (redness) involving part or all of the mucosa which is covered by the denture
- Type 3 - Inflammatory nodular/papillary hyperplasia usually on the central hard palate and the alveolar ridge

== Treatment ==
The most important aspect of treatment is improving denture hygiene, i.e. removing the denture at night, cleaning and disinfecting it, and storing it overnight in an antiseptic solution. This is important as the denture is usually infected with C. albicans which will cause re-infection if it is not removed. Substances which are used include solutions of alkaline peroxides, alkaline hypochlorites (e.g. hypochlorite, which may over time corrode metal components of dental appliances), acids (e.g. benzoic acid), yeast lytic enzymes and proteolytic enzymes (e.g. alcalase protease). The other aspect of treatment involves resolution of the mucosal infection, for which topical antifungal medications are used (e.g. nystatin amphotericin, miconazole, fluconazole or itraconazole). Often an antimicrobial mouthwash such as chlorhexidine is concurrently prescribed. Possible underlying disease (diabetes, HIV) should be treated where possible.

== Prognosis ==
Denture-related stomatitis is usually a harmless condition with no long term consequences. It usually resolves with simple measures such as improved denture hygiene or topical antifungal medication. In severely immunocompromised individuals (e.g. those with HIV), the infection may present a more serious threat.

== Epidemiology ==
Denture-related stomatitis is common and occurs worldwide. Usually the people affected are middle aged or elderly, with females being affected slightly more commonly than males. Prevalences of up to 70% have been reported in elderly care home residents. It is by far the most common type of oral candidiasis.
