= Rudolph L. Hanau =

American dentist

Rudolph L. Hanau (1881–1930) was a mechanical engineer. He is credited with developing the Hanau Articulator. Hanau is also credited with developing the first Kinescope in the field of prosthodontics.

== Life ==
Hanau was born in Victoria West, Cape Colony, South Africa, in 1881. He received mechanical engineering training in Leipzig, Germany. In 1906 he moved to New York City. He began working as a consultant with an American engineering company. Hanau started working with Dr. Frederick Lester Stanton in 1915, and they eventually developed the Stanton-Hanau surveyor. Hanau left New York City and moved to Buffalo, New York in 1918.

== Articulator ==
In 1920, Dr. Rupert E. Hall worked with Hanau on the creation of an articulator. Hanau attended the Boston meeting of the National Society of Denture Prosthetists, where he learned more about articulators. Upon returning from the meeting, Hanau started working with articulators. He then developed the Model A articulator, for which he filed a patient in 1921. He revealed his C Prototype articulator at the Milwaukee meeting of the National Society of Denture Prosthetists in 1921.
