= Dentures =

Prosthetic devices constructed to replace missing teeth

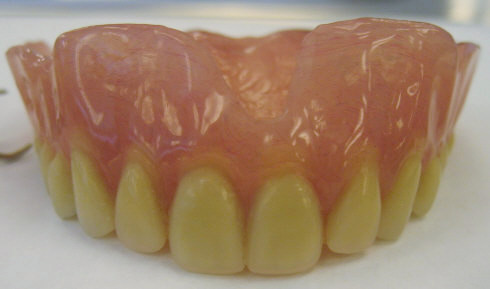
- A maxillary denture
- MeSH: D003778

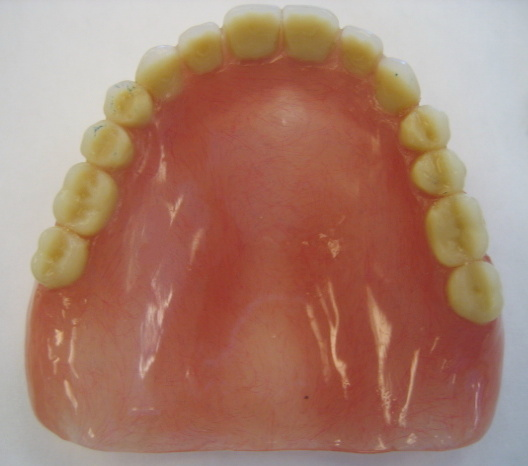
Occlusal view of the same maxillary denture

Dentures (also known as false teeth) are prosthetic devices constructed to replace missing teeth, supported by the surrounding soft and hard tissues of the oral cavity. Conventional dentures are removable (removable partial denture or complete denture). However, there are many denture designs, some of which rely on bonding or clasping onto teeth or dental implants (fixed prosthodontics). There are two main categories of dentures, the distinction being whether they fit onto the mandibular arch or on the maxillary arch.

== Medical uses ==
Dentures can help people via:

- Mastication: chewing ability is improved by the replacement of edentulous (lacking teeth) areas with denture teeth.
- Aesthetics: the presence of teeth gives a natural appearance to the face, and wearing a denture to replace missing teeth provides support for the lips and cheeks and corrects the collapsed appearance that results from the loss of teeth.
- Pronunciation: replacing missing teeth, especially the anteriors, enables patients to speak better, enunciating more easily sibilants and fricatives in particular.
- Self-esteem: improved looks and speech boost confidence in patients' ability to interact socially.

== Complications ==
=== Stomatitis ===
Denture stomatitis is an inflammatory condition of the oral mucosa under the dentures. It can affect both partial and complete denture wearers, and is most commonly seen on the palatal mucosa. Clinically, it appears as simple localized inflammation (Type I), generalized erythema covering the denture-bearing area (Type II) and inflammatory papillary hyperplasia (Type III). People with denture stomatitis are more likely to have angular cheilitis. Denture stomatitis is caused by a mixed infection of Candida albicans (90%) and a number of bacteria such as Staphylococcus, Streptococcus, Fusobacterium and Bacteroides species. Acrylic resin is more susceptible for fungal colonization, adherence and proliferation. Poorly fitted dentures can also cause sores such as canker sore and cold sore.

Denture stomatitis ranks among the most common conditions affecting denture wearers. Bhakti et al. (2024) found a prevalence of 18.8% in a group of 420 patients, and a 2021 study reported a 67.5% from a group of 80 people. Common risk factors for denture stomatitis include denture trauma, poor denture hygiene and nocturnal denture wear. Systemic risk factors also include nutritional deficiencies, immunosuppression, smoking, diabetes, use of steroids, and dry mouth.

The fit of ill-fitting dentures should be fixed to eliminate any dental trauma. Stress on the importance of good denture hygiene including cleaning of the denture, soaking the dentures in disinfectant solution and not wearing it during sleeping at night is the key to treating all types of denture stomatitis. Topical application and systemic use of antifungal agents can be used to treat denture stomatitis cases that fail to respond to local conservative measures.

=== Ulceration ===
Mouth ulceration is the most common lesion in people with dentures. It can be caused by repetitive minor trauma like poorly fitting dentures including over-extension of a denture. Pressure-indicating paste can be used to check the fitting of dentures. It allows the areas of premature contact to be distinguished from areas of physiologic tissue contact. Therefore, the particular area can be polished with an acrylic bur. Leaching of residual monomer methyl methacrylate from inadequately cured denture acrylic resin material can cause mucosal irritation and hence oral ulceration as well. Patients are advised to use warm salt water mouth rinses and a betamethasone rinse which can heal such ulcers. Review of persisting oral ulcerations for more than 3 weeks is recommended.

== Tooth loss ==
People can become entirely edentulous for many reasons, the most prevalent being removal due to dental disease, which typically relates to oral flora control, i.e., periodontal disease and tooth decay. Other reasons include pregnancy, tooth developmental defects caused by severe malnutrition, genetic defects such as dentinogenesis imperfecta, trauma, and drug use.

Periodontitis is defined as an inflammatory lesion mediated by host-pathogen interaction that results in the loss of connective tissue fiber attachment to the root surface and ultimately to the alveolar bone. It is the loss of connective tissue to the root surface that leads to teeth falling out. The hormones associated with pregnancy increases the risk of gingivitis and vomiting.

Hormones released during pregnancy softens the cardia muscle ring that keeps food within the stomach. Hydrochloric acid is the acid involved in gastric reflux, also known as morning sickness. This acid, at a pH of 1.5-3.5, coats the enamel on the teeth, mainly affecting the palatal surfaces of the maxillary teeth. Eventually the enamel is softened and easily wears away.

Dental trauma refers to trauma (injury) to the teeth and/or periodontium (gums, periodontal ligament, alveolar bone). Strong force may cause the root of the tooth to completely dislocate from its socket, mild trauma may cause the tooth to chip.

== Types ==
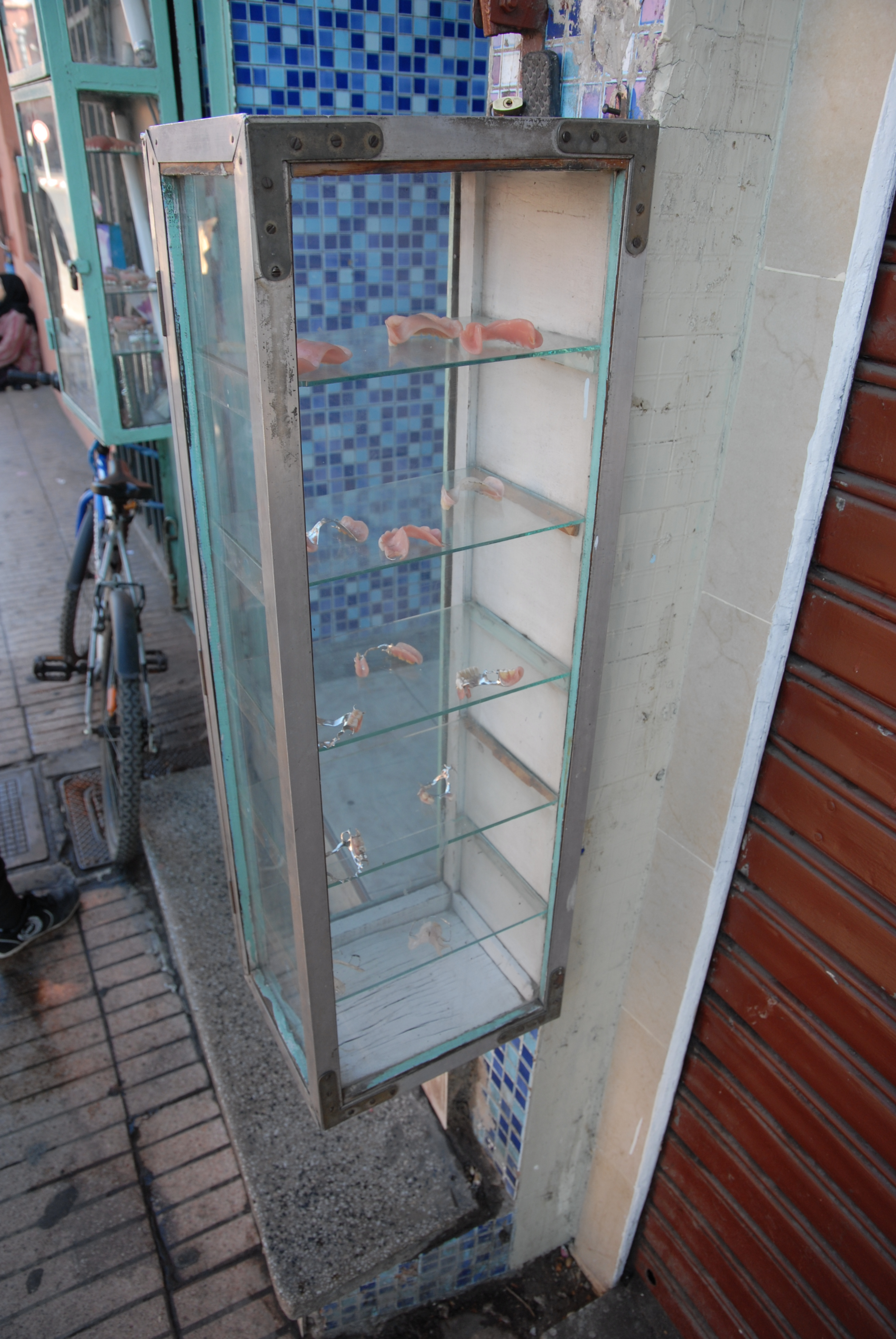
Vending of dentures in Marrakesh (Morocco)

=== Removable partial dentures ===
Removable partial dentures are for patients who are missing some of their teeth on a particular arch. Fixed partial dentures, also known as "crown and bridge" dentures, are made from crowns that are fitted on the remaining teeth. They act as abutments and pontics, and are made from materials resembling the missing teeth. Fixed bridges are more expensive than removable appliances but are more stable.

Another option in this category is the flexible partial, which takes advantage of innovations in digital technology. Flexible partial fabrication involves only non-invasive procedures. Dentures can be difficult to clean and can affect oral hygiene.

=== Complete dentures ===
Complete dentures are worn by patients who are missing all of the teeth in a single arch—i.e. the maxillary (upper) or mandibular (lower) arch—or, more commonly, in both arches. The full denture is removable because it is held in place by suction. They are painful at first and can take some time to get used to. There are two types of full dentures: immediate dentures and conventional dentures.

=== Copy dentures ===
Copy dentures can be made for either partial, but mainly complete denture patients. These dentures require fewer visits to make and usually are made for older patients, patients who would have difficulty adjusting to new dentures, would like a spare pair of dentures or like the aesthetics of their dentures already. This requires taking an impression of the patient's current denture and remaking it.

=== Materials ===
Dentures are mainly made from acrylic due to the ease of material manipulation and likeness to intra-oral tissues, i.e. gums. Most dentures are composed of heat-cured acrylic polymethyl methacrylate and rubber-reinforced polymethyl methacrylate. Coloring agents and synthetic fibers are added to obtain the tissue-like shade, and to mimic the small capillaries of the oral mucosa, respectively. However, dentures made from acrylic can be fragile and fracture easily if the patient has trouble adapting neuromuscular control. This can be overcome by reinforcing the denture base with cobalt chromium (Co-Cr). They are often thinner (therefore more comfortable) and stronger (to prevent repeating fractures).

== History ==
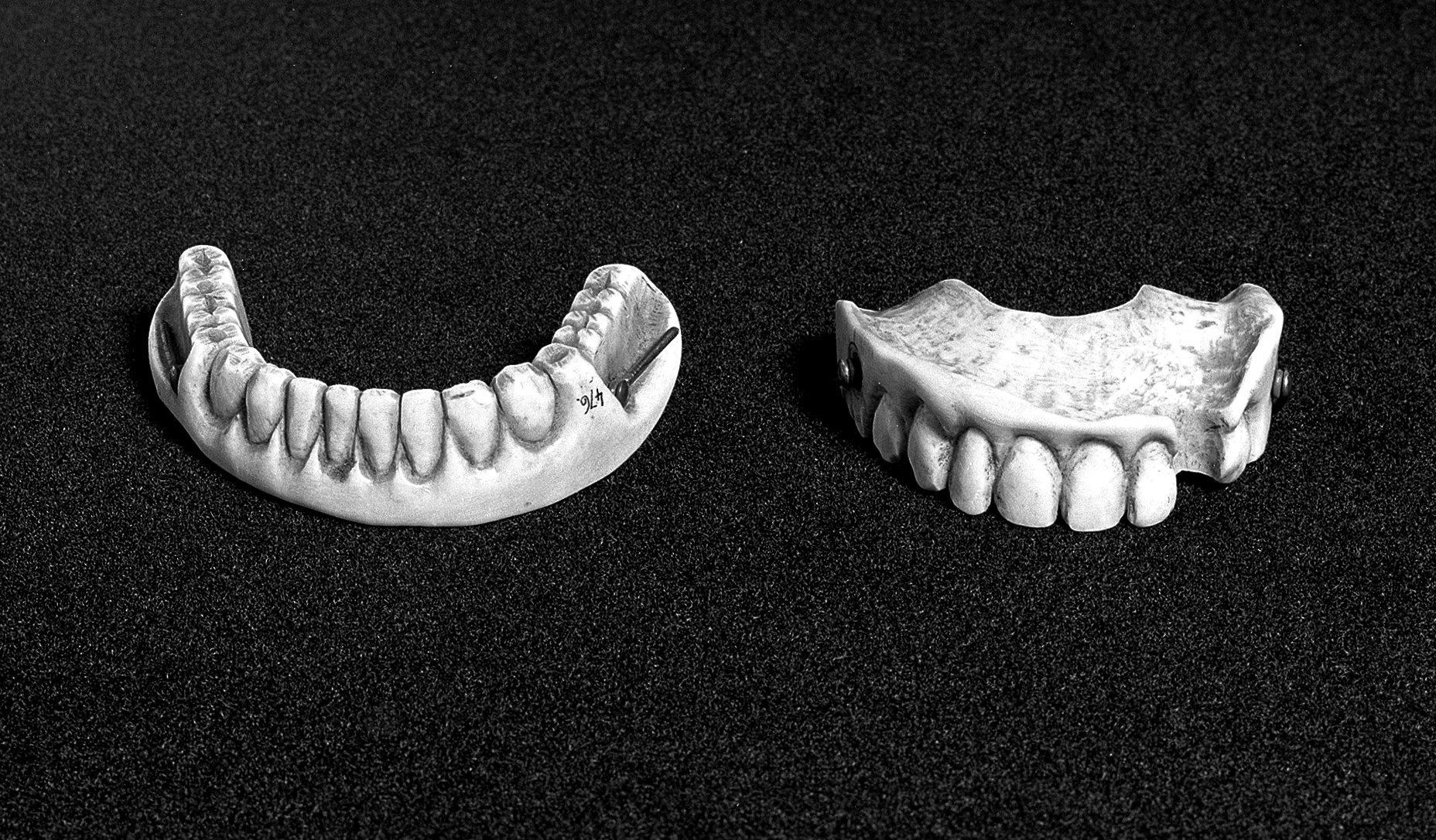
Carved ivory dentures from the 18th century. Left is lower/mandibular; upper/maxillary is at right.

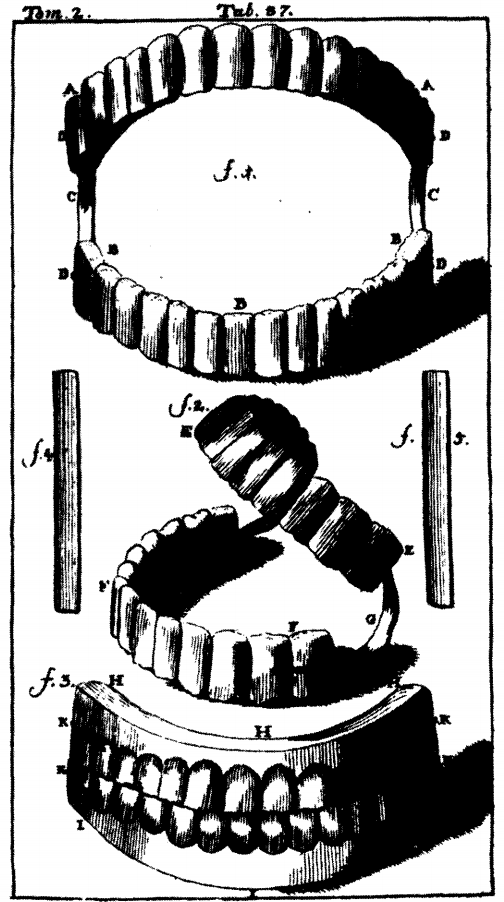
Pierre Fauchard described the construction of dentures using a metal frame, animal bone teeth, and leaf springs in 1728.

As early as the 7th century BC, Etruscans in northern Italy made partial dentures out of human or other animal teeth fastened together with gold bands. The Romans had likely borrowed this technique by the 5th century BC. A text by Martial (c. AD 40-103) referenced Cascellius, who extracted or repaired painful teeth. H. L. Strömgren (1935), postulated that by repairing it was meant tooth replacement and not tooth filling.

Wooden full dentures were invented in Japan around the early 16th century. Softened beeswax was inserted into the patient's mouth to create an impression, which was then filled with harder bees wax. Wooden dentures were then meticulously carved based on that model. The earliest of these dentures were entirely wooden, but later versions used natural human teeth or sculpted pagodite, ivory, or animal horn for the teeth. These dentures were built with a broad base, exploiting the principles of adhesion to stay in place. This was an advanced technique for the era; it was not replicated in the West until the late 18th century. Wooden dentures continued to be used in Japan until the Opening of Japan to the West in the 19th century.

In 1728, Pierre Fauchard described the construction of dentures using a metal frame and teeth sculpted from animal bone. The first porcelain dentures were made around 1770 by Alexis Duchâteau. In 1791, the first British patent was granted to Nicholas Dubois De Chemant, previous assistant to Duchateau, for "De Chemant's Specification":

... a composition for the purpose of making of artificial teeth either single double or in rows or in complete sets, and also springs for fastening or affixing the same in a more easy and effectual manner than any hitherto discovered which said teeth may be made of any shade or colour, which they will retain for any length of time and will consequently more perfectly resemble the natural teeth.

He began selling his wares in 1792, with most of his porcelain paste supplied by Wedgwood.

17th century London's Peter de la Roche is believed to be one of the first 'operators for the teeth', men who advertized themselves as specialists in dental work. They were often professional goldsmiths, ivory turners or students of barber-surgeons.

In 1820, Samuel Stockton, a goldsmith by trade, began manufacturing high-quality porcelain dentures mounted on 18-carat gold plates. Later dentures from the 1850s onwards were made of Vulcanite, a form of hardened rubber into which porcelain teeth were set. In the 20th century, acrylic resin and other plastics were used. In Britain, sequential Adult Dental Health Surveys revealed that in 1968 79% of those aged 65–74 had no natural teeth; by 1998, this proportion had fallen to 36%.

=== George Washington ===
George Washington (1732–1799) suffered from problems with his teeth throughout his life, and historians have tracked his experiences in great detail. He lost his first adult tooth when he was twenty-two and had only one left by the time he became president. He had several sets of false teeth made, four of them by a dentist named John Greenwood. None of the sets, contrary to popular belief, were made from wood or contained any wood. The set made when he became president were carved from hippopotamus and elephant ivory, held together with gold springs. Prior to these, he had a set made with real human teeth, likely ones he purchased from "several unnamed Negroes, presumably Mount Vernon slaves" in 1784.

== Manufacturing ==
Modern dentures are most often fabricated in a commercial dental laboratory or by a denturist using a combination of tissue shaded powders polymethyl methacrylate acrylic (PMMA). These acrylics are available as heat-cured or cold-cured types. Commercially produced acrylic teeth are widely available in hundreds of shapes and tooth colors.

The process of fabricating a denture usually begins with an initial dental impression of the maxillary and mandibular ridges. Standard impression materials are used during the process. The initial impression is used to create a simple stone model that represents the maxillary and mandibular arches of the patient's mouth. This is not a detailed impression at this stage. Once the initial impression is taken, the stone model is used to create a 'custom impression tray', which is then used to take a second and much more detailed and accurate impression of the patient's maxillary and mandibular ridges. Polyvinyl siloxane impression material is one of several very accurate impression materials used when the final impression is taken of the maxillary and mandibular ridges. A wax rim is fabricated to assist the dentist or denturist in establishing the vertical dimension of occlusion. After this, a bite registration is created to marry the position of one arch to the other.

Once the relative position of each arch to the other is known, the wax rim can be used as a base to place the selected denture teeth in correct position. This arrangement of teeth is tested in the mouth so that adjustments can be made to the occlusion. After the occlusion has been verified by the dentist or denturist and the patient, and all phonetic requirements are met, the denture is processed.

Processing a denture is usually performed using a lost-wax technique whereby the form of the final denture, including the acrylic denture teeth, is invested in stone. This investment is then heated, and when it melts the wax is removed through a spruing channel. The remaining cavity is then either filled by forced injection or pouring in the uncured denture acrylic, which is either a heat-cured or cold-cured type. During the processing period, heat cured acrylics—also called permanent denture acrylics—go through a process called polymerization, causing the acrylic materials to bond very tightly and taking several hours to complete. After a curing period, the stone investment is removed, the acrylic is polished, and the denture is complete. The end result is a denture that looks much more natural, is much stronger and more durable than a cold-cured temporary denture, resists stains and odors, and will last for many years.

Cold-cured or cold-pour dentures, also known as temporary dentures, do not look as natural, are less durable, tend to be highly porous and are only used as a temporary expedient until a more permanent solution is found. These types of dentures tend to cost much less due to their quick production time (usually minutes) and composition of low-cost materials. It is not suggested that a patient wear a cold-cured denture for a long period of time, as they are prone to cracks and can break rather easily.

== Prosthodontic principles ==
=== Support ===
Support is the principle that describes how well the underlying mucosa (oral tissues, including gums) keeps the denture from moving vertically towards the arch in question during chewing, and thus being excessively depressed and moving deeper into the arch. For the mandibular arch, this function is provided primarily by the buccal shelf, a region extending laterally from the back or posterior ridges, and by the pear-shaped pad (the most posterior area of keratinized gingival formed by the scaling down of the retro-molar papilla after the extraction of the last molar tooth). Secondary support for the complete mandibular denture is provided by the alveolar ridge crest. The maxillary arch receives primary support from the horizontal hard palate and the posterior alveolar ridge crest. The larger the denture flanges (that part of the denture that extends into the vestibule), the better the stability (another parameter to assess fit of a complete denture). Long flanges beyond the functional depth of the sulcus are a common error in denture construction, often (but not always) leading to movement in function, and ulcerations (denture sore spots).

=== Stability ===
Stability is the principle that describes how well the denture base is prevented from moving in a horizontal plane, and thus sliding from side to side or front to back. The more the denture base (pink material) is in smooth and continuous contact with the edentulous ridge (the hill upon which the teeth used to reside, but now only residual alveolar bone with overlying mucosa), the better the stability. Of course, the higher and broader the ridge, the better the stability will be, but this is usually a result of patient anatomy, barring surgical intervention (bone grafts, etc.).

=== Retention ===
Retention is the principle that describes how well the denture is prevented from moving vertically in the opposite direction of insertion. The better the topographical mimicry of the intaglio (interior) surface of the denture base to the surface of the underlying mucosa, the better the retention will be (in removable partial dentures, the clasps are a major provider of retention), as surface tension, suction and friction will aid in keeping the denture base from breaking intimate contact with the mucosal surface. The most critical element in the retentive design of a maxillary complete denture is a complete and total border seal (complete peripheral seal) in order to achieve 'suction'. The border seal is composed of the edges of the anterior and lateral aspects and the posterior palatal seal. The posterior palatal seal design is accomplished by covering the entire hard palate and extending not beyond the soft palate and ending 1–2 mm from the vibrating line.

Prosthodontists use a scale called the Kapur index to quantify denture stability and retention.

Implant technology can vastly improve the patient's denture-wearing experience by increasing stability and preventing bone from wearing away. Implants can also aid retention. Instead of merely placing the implants to serve as blocking mechanism against the denture's pushing on the alveolar bone, small retentive appliances can be attached to the implants that can then snap into a modified denture base to allow for tremendously increased retention. Available options include a metal "Hader bar" or precision ball attachments.

=== Fit, maintenance and relining ===
Generally speaking, partial dentures tend to be held in place by the presence of the remaining natural teeth and complete dentures tend to rely on muscular co-ordination and limited suction to stay in place. The maxilla very commonly has more favorable denture-bearing anatomy, as the ridge tends to be well formed and there is a larger area on the palate for suction to retain the denture. Conversely, the mandible tends to make lower dentures much less retentive due to the displacing presence of the tongue and the higher rate of resorption, frequently leading to significantly resorbed lower ridges. Disto-lingual regions tend to offer retention even in highly resorbed mandibles, and extension of the flange into these regions tends to produce a more retentive lower denture. An implant supported lower denture is another option for improving retention.

Dentures that fit well during the first few years after creation will not necessarily fit well for the rest of the wearer's lifetime. This is because the bone and mucosa of the mouth are living tissues, which are dynamic over decades. Bone remodeling never stops in living bone. Edentulous jaw ridges tend to resorb progressively over the years, especially the alveolar ridge of the lower jaw. Mucosa reacts to being chronically rubbed by the dentures. Poorly fitting dentures hasten both of those processes compared to the rates with well-fitting dentures. Poor fitting dentures may also lead to the development of conditions such as epulis fissuratum. In addition, the occlusion (chewing surfaces of the teeth) tends to wear away over time, which reduces chewing efficacy and decreases the vertical dimension of occlusion (the "openness" of the jaws and mouth).

== Costs ==
In countries where denturism is legally performed by denturists, it is typically a denturist association that publishes the fee guide. In countries where it is performed by dentists, it is typically a dental association that publishes the fee guide. Some governments also provide additional coverage for the purchase of dentures by seniors. Typically, only standard low-cost dentures are covered by insurance and because many individuals would prefer to have a premium cosmetic denture or a premium precision denture they rely on consumer dental patient financing options.

A low-cost denture starts at about $300–$500 per denture, or $600–$1,000 for a complete set of upper and lower dentures. These tend to be cold-cured dentures, which are considered temporary because of the lower quality materials and streamlined processing methods used in their manufacture. In many cases, there is no opportunity to try them on for fit before they are finished. They also tend to look artificial and not as natural as higher quality, higher priced dentures.

A mid-priced (and better quality) heat-cured denture typically costs $500–$1,500 per denture, or $1,000–$3,000 for a complete set. The teeth look much more natural and are much longer-lasting than cold-cured or temporary dentures. In many cases, they may be tried out before they are finished to ensure that all the teeth occlude (meet) properly and look esthetically pleasing. These usually come with a 90-day to two-year warranty and in some cases a money-back guarantee if the customer is not satisfied. In some cases, the cost of subsequent adjustments to the dentures is included.

Premium heat-cured dentures can cost $2,000–$4,000 per denture, or $4,000–$8,000 or more for a set. Dentures in this price range are usually completely customized and personalized, use high-end materials to simulate the lifelike look of gums and teeth as closely as possible, last a long time and are warrantied against chipping and cracking for 5–10 years or longer. Often the price includes several follow-up visits to fine-tune the fit.

In the United Kingdom, as of 13 March 2018, an NHS patient must pay £244.30 for a denture to be made. This is a flat rate and no additional charges may be made regarding material used or appointments needed. Privately, the cost can lie upwards of £300.

== Care ==
Daily cleaning of dentures is recommended. Plaque and tartar can build up on false teeth, just as they do on natural teeth. Cleaning can be done using chemical or mechanical denture cleaners. Dentures should not be worn continuously, but rather taken out of the mouth during sleep. This is to give the tissues a chance to recover: wearing dentures at night is likened to sleeping in shoes. The main risk is the development of fungal infections, especially denture-related stomatitis. Dentures should also be removed while smoking, as the heat can damage the denture acrylic, and overheated acrylic can burn the soft tissues.

Deposits such as microbial plaque, calculus and food debris can accumulate on the dentures, which may lead to issues such as angular stomatitis, denture stomatitis, undesirable odors and tastes as well as staining. These deposits can also quicken the degradation of some of the denture materials. Due to the presence of these deposits, there is an increased risk of the denture wearer and other people around them developing a systemic disease by organisms such as methicillin-resistant Staphylococcus aureus (MRSA), but research shows that denture cleaners are effective against MRSA. Therefore, denture cleaning is imperative for the overall health of the denture wearers as well as for the health of people they come into contact with.

=== Brushing ===
After receiving dentures, the patient should brush them often with soap, water and a soft nylon toothbrush which has a small head, as this will enable the brush to reach into all the areas of the denture surface. The bristles must be soft in order for them to easily conform to the contours of the dentures for adequate cleaning: stiff bristles will not conform well and are likely to cause abrasion of the denture acrylic resin. If a patient finds it difficult to utilize a toothbrush, e.g. a patient with arthritis, a brush with easy-grip modifications may be used.

Disclosing solutions can be used at home to make less obvious plaque deposits more visible to ensure thorough cleaning of plaque. Food dyes can be utilized as a disclosing solution when used correctly.

Instead of brushing their dentures with soap and water, patients can use pastes designed for dentures or conventional toothpaste to clean their dentures. However, the American Dental Association advises against using toothpaste as it can be too harsh for cleaning dentures.

=== Immersion ===
Patients should combine the brushing of their dentures with soaking them in an immersion cleaner from time to time as this combined cleaning strategy has been shown to control denture plaque. Due to microbial invasion, the lack of use of immersion cleaners and inadequate denture plaque control will cause rapid deterioration of the soft linings of the denture.

=== Cleansers and methods ===
Liquid cleansers that dentures can be immersed in include: bleaches e.g. sodium hypochlorite; effervescent solutions e.g. alkaline peroxides, perborates and persulfates; acid cleaners.

=== Sodium hypochlorite cleansers ===
Sodium hypochlorite (NaOCl) cleansers have a disinfectant action and remove non-viable organisms and other deposits from the surface, but they are weak for eliminating calculus from the denture surface. Immersing dentures in a hypochlorite solution for more than 6 hours occasionally will eliminate plaque and staining. Furthermore, as microbial invasion is prevented, the deterioration of the soft lining material does not occur. Corrosion of cobalt chromium has occurred when hypochlorite cleansers have been used, and they may also result in the fading of the acrylic and silicone lining, but the softness or elastically of the linings are not greatly changed.

=== Effervescent cleansers ===
Effervescent cleansers are the most popular immersion cleansers and include alkaline peroxides, perborates and persulfates. Their cleansing action occurs by the formation of small bubbles which displace loosely-attached material from the surface of the denture. They are not very effective as cleansers and have a restricted ability to eliminate microbial plaque. Moreover, they are safe for use and do not cause deterioration of the acrylic resin or the metals used in denture construction. Despite this, they are able to cause rapid damage to some short-term soft lining. Discoloration of the acrylic resin to a white denture often occurs; however, this can be due to the use of very hot water with cleaning agents against manufacturer instructions.

=== Acid cleansers ===
Sulfamic acid is a type of acid cleanser that is used to prevent the formation of calculus on dentures. Sulfamic acid has a very good compatibility with many denture materials, including the metals used in denture construction. 5% hydrochloric acid is another type of acid cleanser. In this case, the denture is immersed in the hydrochloric cleanser to soften the calculus so that it can be brushed away. The acid can cause damage to clothes if accidentally spilt, and can cause corrosion of cobalt-chromium or stainless steel if immersed in the acid often and for long periods of time.

=== Other denture cleaning methods ===
Other denture cleaning methods include enzymes, ultrasonic cleansers and microwave exposure. A Cochrane Review found that there is weak evidence to support soaking dentures in effervescent tablets or in enzymatic solutions, and while the most effective method for eliminating plaque is not clear, the review shows that brushing with paste eliminates microbial plaque better than inactive methods. There is a need for studies to provide reports about the cost of materials and the negative effects that may be associated with their use, as these factors could affect the acceptability of such materials by patients which will in turn affect their effectiveness in a daily setting in the long term. Putting dentures into a dishwasher overnight can be a useful shortcut when away from home. Additionally, further studies comparing the different methods of cleaning dentures are needed.

=== Broken dentures ===
Dentures sometimes break, often during eating or when dropped during cleaning. A repair or replacement should be sought as soon as possible to restore function and aesthetics; the continued wearing of a broken denture results in unnecessary intra-oral tissue irritation, which may result in an increased risk of infection and other pathologies including malignancies.

== See also ==
- Full mouth extraction, the prophylactic removal of all teeth
