= Maximum intercuspation =

Anatomical position in dentistry

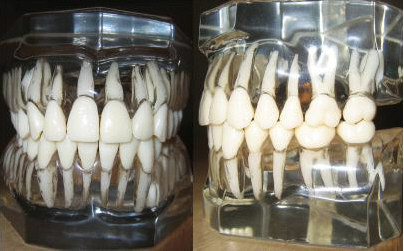
Models of human teeth in maximum intercuspation. The models are transparent to allow the viewer to perceive the roots of the teeth as they reside naturally within the alveolar bone.

In dentistry, maximum intercuspation refers to the occlusal position of the mandible in which the cusps of the teeth of both arches fully interpose themselves with the cusps of the teeth of the opposing arch. This position used to be referred to as centric occlusion.

This is an important jaw position, as it defines both the anterior-posterior and lateral relationships of the mandible and the maxilla, as well as the superior-inferior relationship known as the vertical dimension of occlusion. These are important considerations in orthodontic treatment as well as for dental prostheses and their design and use.

== See also ==
- Occlusion (dentistry)
