= Frederick Lester Stanton =

Frederick Lester Stanton (March 9, 1873 – January 1, 1945) was an American orthodontist who played a key role in forming of first specialized dental journal The American Orthodontist and formation of the Hanau Articulator with Rudolph L. Hanau. He also attended Angle School of Orthodontia and graduated from there in 1905.

== Life ==
Stanton was born in Norwich, Connecticut, in 1873 to Caroline and George Stanton. He had a club foot deformity which he lived through most of his childhood. He eventually moved to Brooklyn with his family to continue his surgical treatment in the city. He attended Boys High School (Brooklyn). He developed his interest of dentistry under W. G. Stewart. He eventually attended New York College of Dentistry in 1891 and obtained his degree the year after. He then opened his office on West 34th Street in New York City. Due to living his childhood as handicapped, Stanton's interest gave way to study of orthodontics, where he wanted to focus on correcting malocclusions of children. He attended Angle School of Orthodontia in 1905 in St. Louis and moved back to New York City to practice as an orthodontist.

He was married to Virginia R. Stanton and had a son, John Alden Stanton, and a daughter, Carolin Stanton Rhoades.

== Career ==
Stanton helped organized the Alumni Society of Angle School of Orthodontia and eventually became the president of the society in 1907. In addition, he played a significant part in formation of the journal The American Orthodontist in 1907, which at that time was the first specialized dental publication. While in New York City, he also assisted Edward Angle with the Angle School of Orthodontia and became the secretary of the school from 1908 to 1909. He taught the course of rhinology at the school during these two years. Based on Stanton's efforts to have a study group in order to promote orthodontic thought, Eastern Association of Graduates of Angle School of Orthodontia was formed.

Stanton along with Rudolph Hanau designed a device to survey a human dentition. The results of their effort was published in an article named An Instrument for Surveying and Mapping the Denture. Under Stanton's guidance, Hanau was able to develop his interest in dentistry and make many of his contributions to dentistry.

After the New York University College of Dentistry was bought by New York University, Stanton became a professor in the department of preventative dentistry and occlusion. He was the first person to teach the subject of in a dental curriculum. He also became professor in the orthodontic department until 1933. He eventually retired in 1937 after organizing a division of child research at NYU. He died on January 1, 1945.

== Research ==
In order to understand the tooth movement, Stanton used the theory of least squares and was able to compute the least possible sum of total tooth movements necessary in treatment to change the positions of all teeth from existing malocclusion. Therefore he computed an imaginary point called centroid for each map.

== Awards and positions ==
- New York College of Dentistry Alumni Association, president, 1923
