= Vertical dimension of occlusion =

Term in dentistry

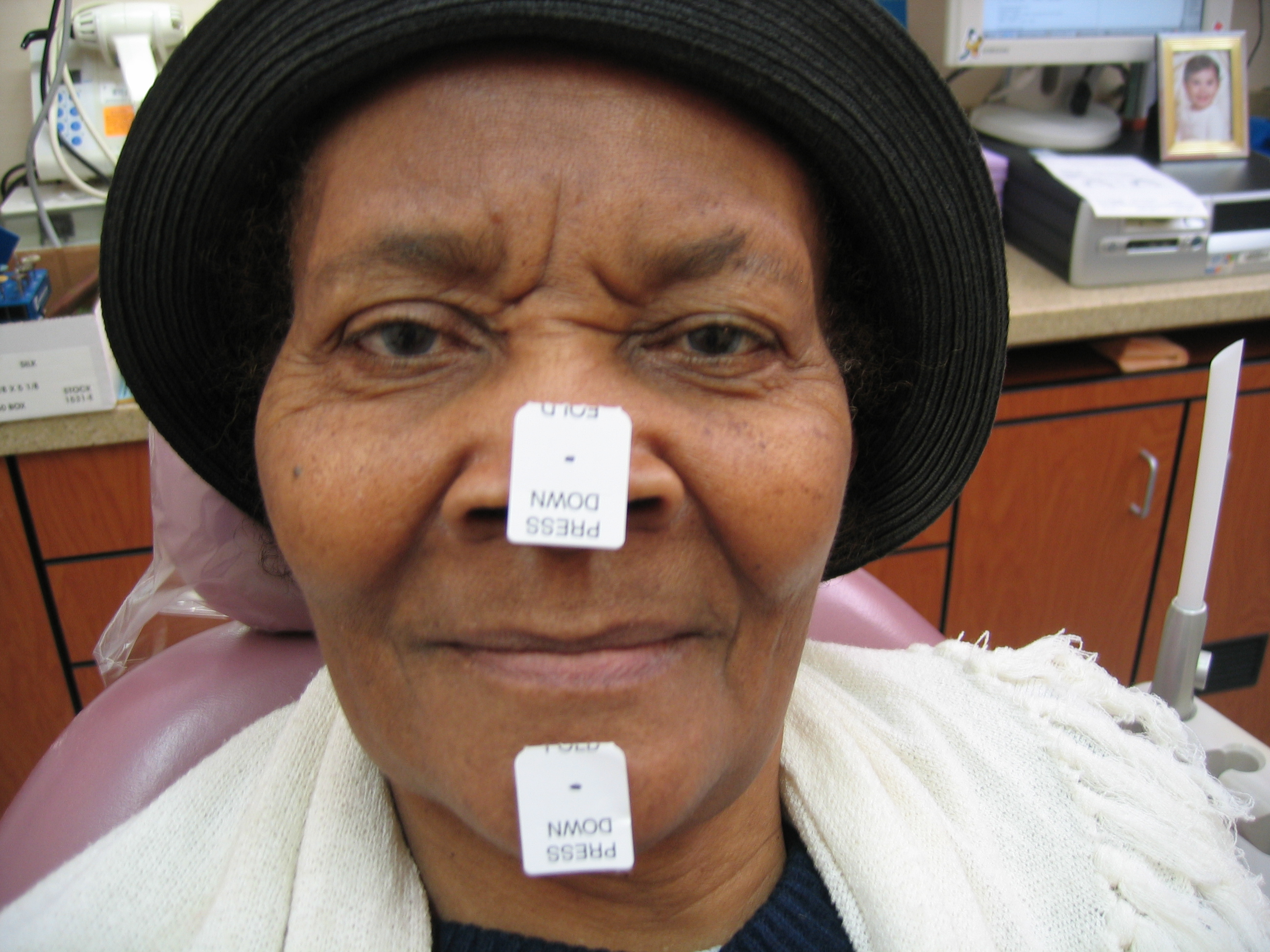
A patient prepared for measurement of VDO. Two stickers have been affixed to her face in order to establish the distance between the dots drawn on the stickers when her mandible is in a position that matches her VDO. Because this patient is completely edentulous (has no teeth), her VDO measurement will be subjectively based on esthetics and phonetics.

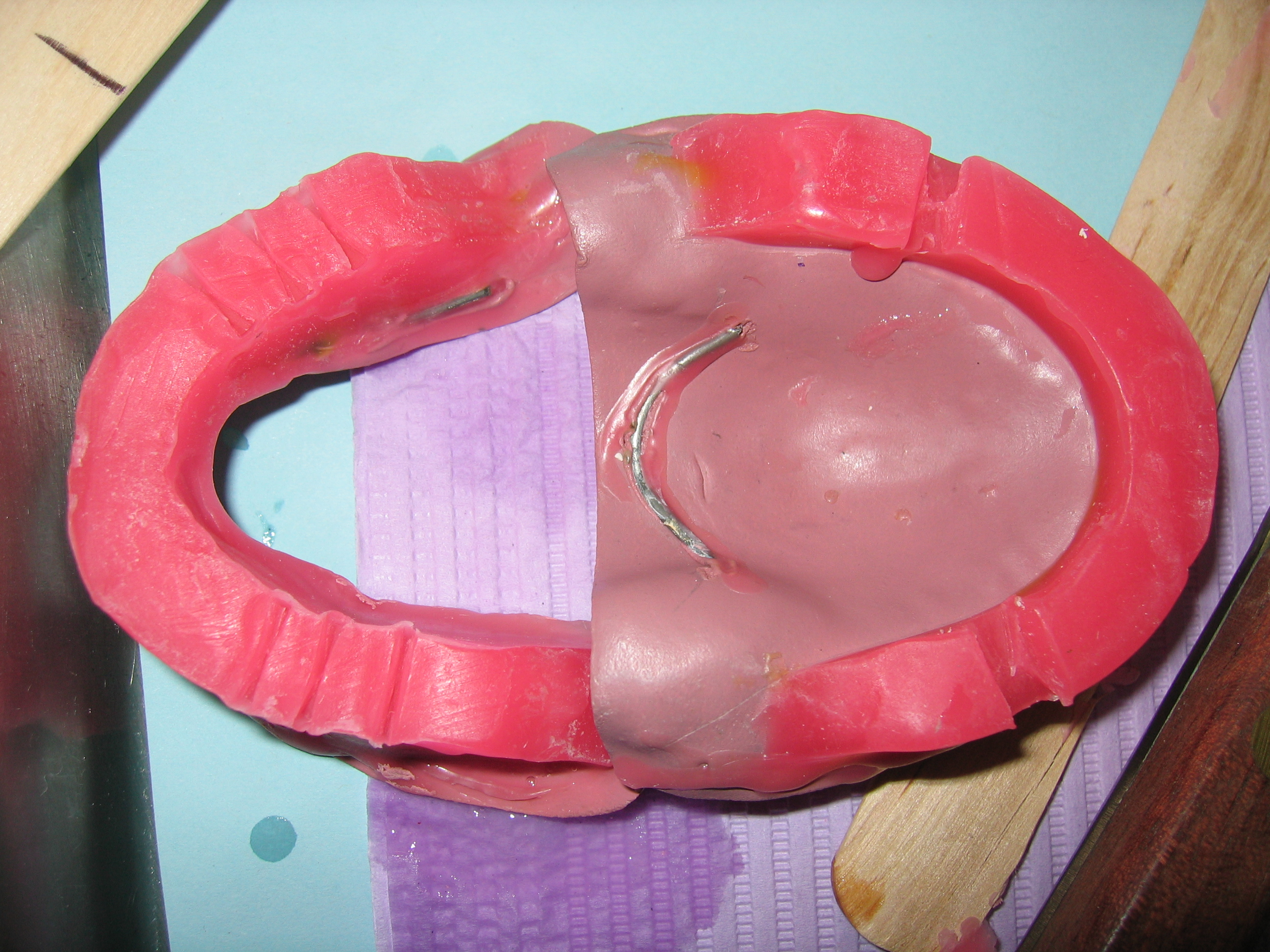
Maxillary and mandibular record bases with notched wax rims. When placed in the mouth, these two preliminary appliances will be able to record a measured VDO because the patient will be unable to close further than the wax will allow. The wax is built up or removed until the appropriate VDO has been established. The two wax rims are then notched in order to allow an index of the relationship of the maxillary rim to the mandibular rim with a medium, such as Alluwax or Regisal.

Vertical dimension of occlusion, or VDO, also known as occlusal vertical dimension (OVD), is a term used in dentistry to indicate the superior-inferior relationship of the maxilla and the mandible when the teeth are occluded in maximum intercuspation.

A VDO is not only possessed by people who have teeth, however; for completely edentulous individuals who do not have any teeth with which to position themselves in maximum intercuspation, VDO can be measured based on subjective signs related to esthetics and phonetics.

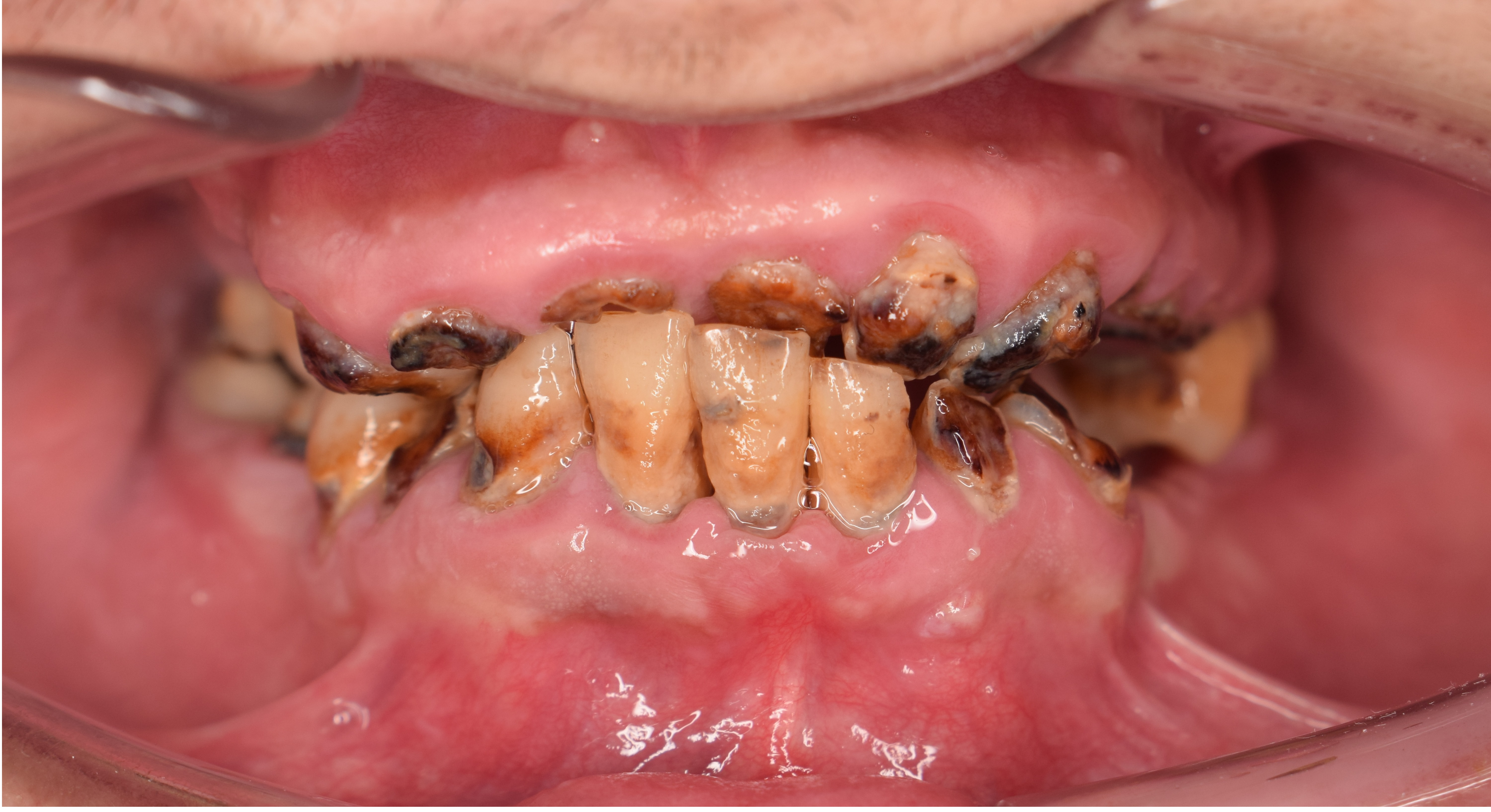
Loss of vertical dimension due to tooth decay and loss.

In terms of esthetics, an appropriately measured VDO will appear to a layman's eye as an ordinary configuration of the patient's nose, lips and chin. An excessive VDO will appear as though the patient has something stuffed into their mouth, and the patient may not even be able to close their lips. A telltale indication of an excessive VDO is a patient straining to close their lips around the wax rims during VDO determination. Conversely, a deficient VDO will appear as though the patient's mouth has collapsed, and the chin appears too close to the nose; in essence, the patient would be over-closing their mouth because there would not be enough wax on the wax rims to maintain the proper vertical dimension of occlusion.

In terms of phonetics, certain sounds are made by configuring the mouth in specific ways. The two sounds most commonly used to establish a patient's VDO are sibilant and fricative sounds. Sibiliant sounds are made by allowing the maxillary incisors to nearly touch the mandibular incisors, while fricative sounds are made by allowing the maxillary incisors to touch the slightly inverted lower lip at the wet-dry line. By having the patient count upwards from fifty and then upwards from sixty, the dentist can watch and listen to the patient attempting to make first fricative and then sibilant sounds and adjust the wax rims accordingly.

A common trick is to ask the patient to say the name "Emma," as the position of the mandible immediately after completing the word is a rough estimate of the patient's proper VDO. The position after saying "Emma" is referred to as the vertical dimension at rest, or VDR. Historically, the VDO has been estimated at 3 mm less than VDR because a person will generally maintain their mandible at an opening of 3 mm when at rest.

There is another rule that applies to many mammals which give us a very practical way to find a suitable VDO. Take the distance between the inner corner of the eye and the same corner of the lips (in older people the measurement should be done a little more medially (closer to the nose) to avoid a down-pointing lip corner). Using a ruler, apply this measurement between the center bottom of the nose (that rises from the upper lip) and lower tip of the mandible center. (In the completely edentulous (those with no teeth), do as referred.) Maintain a centric position.
