= Moa (disambiguation) =

Moa are extinct giant flightless birds native to New Zealand.

Moa or MOA may also refer to:

== Arts and media ==
- Metal Open Air, a Brazilian heavy metal festival
- MOA Museum of Art, in Japan
- The Moas, New Zealand film awards

== Organizations and companies ==
- Mine Owners' Association, US
- Ministry of Agriculture
- Moscow Airlines (ICAO airline designator: MOA)

== Places ==
=== Buildings ===
- Mall of Africa, Midrand, South Africa
- Mall of America, Minnesota, US
- Mall of Arabia (Dubai), a planned shopping mall, United Arab Emirates
- Mall of Arabia (Jeddah), Saudi Arabia
- Museum of Anthropology at UBC, Canada
- Mall of Amritsar, former name of Nexus Amritsar, Amritsar, India
- SM Mall of Asia, in Manila, Philippines
  - SM Mall of Asia Arena, an indoor arena in Pasay, Metro Manila, Philippines

=== Islands ===
- Moa (island), one of the Leti Islands, Indonesia
- Moa Island (Queensland), Australia

=== Rivers ===
- Moa River, west Africa
- Môa River, Brazil
- Moa River (Cuba), see Nuevo Mundo Dam, Cuba

=== Towns and villages ===
- Moa, Cuba
- Moa, Mkinga, Tanzania
- Moa, Niger

== Science and technology ==
- Magnetic field oscillating amplified thruster, a novel propulsion system with several terrestrial applications
- Mars Organic Analyzer, part of a NASA mission
- Massive Online Analysis, software for data stream mining with concept drift
- Mechanism of action, the means by which a drug exerts its biological effects
- Method of administration, in medicine
- Methoxyacrylate, an inhibitor of the cytochrome bc_{1} complex
- Microlensing Observations in Astrophysics, a group of astrophysicists searching for exoplanets
- Migraine without aura, in medicine
- Minute of arc, a unit of angular measurement
  - Minute of angle, a way of determining firearm accuracy
- Mode of action, a field which investigates how a toxin affects an organism in vivo
- Psilotum nudum, a plant species also called whisk fern, known as moa in the Hawaiian Islands

== Ships of the New Zealand Navy ==
- Moa-class patrol boat, built between 1978 and 1985
- HMNZS Moa (P3553), a patrol boat
- HMNZS Moa (T233), a minesweeper

== People ==
- Moa (name), including people with the given name or surname
- Mohammed Abdellaoue (born 1985), Norwegian football player nicknamed "Moa"
- Móa (singer) (born Móeiður Júníusdóttir 1972), Icelandic musician

== Other uses ==
- Manner of articulation, in linguistics
- Jaynagarer Moa or Moa, a Bengali sweet
- Making of America (MoA), a digital library project of the University of Michigan and Cornell University
- Memorandum of agreement or memorandum of understanding, an agreement between two or more parties
- Memorandum of association, a document required to incorporate a company in many Commonwealth countries
- Military operations area, an area where US military activity takes place
- Moa, the fandom name for the K-Pop group Tomorrow X Together

== See also ==
- Moai (disambiguation)
- Mua (disambiguation)
- Mower
