= Rochette =

Rochette may refer to:

== Surname ==
- Desiré-Raoul Rochette (1790-1854), a French archaeologist.
- Edward C. Rochette (1927–2018), American numismatist
- Jean-Marc Rochette (b. 1956), a French painter, illustrator and comics creator.
- Joannie Rochette (b. 1986), a Canadian figure skater.
- Nicolas Gargot de la Rochette, Governor of Plaisance (Placentia)

== Other uses ==
- La Rochette (disambiguation), the name of several communes in France
- Prix La Rochette, a Group 3 flat horse race in France
- Rochette bridge, a type of dental prosthesis popular in the 1970s invented by Alain Rochette of France.
