= Moa (name) =

Moa is both a surname and a given name. Notable people with the name include:

== Surname ==
- Anika Moa (born 1980), New Zealand singer-songwriter
- David Moa (born 1996), American football player
- Paulus Moa (1940–2023), Indonesian politician
- Pío Moa (born 1948), Spanish journalist
- Salesi Moa (born 2007), American football player
- Sam Moa (born 1986), Tonga & NZ international rugby league footballer
- Suli Moa, New Zealand playwright, actor, screenwriter
- Taniela Moa (1985–2021), Tonga international rugby union player

== Given name ==
- Moa Arimoto (born 1986), Japanese actress and model
- Moa Backe Åstot (born 1998), Swedish Sámi author
- Moa Dryburgh (born 2005), Swedish curler
- Moa Folke (born 1995), Swedish professional golfer
- Moa Gammel (born 1980), Swedish actress
- Moa Granat (born 2004), Swedish athlete
- Moa Hjelmer (born 1990), Swedish sprinter
- Moa Ilar (born 1997), Swedish cross-country skier
- Moa do Katendê (1954–2018), Brazilian composer
- Moa Kikuchi (born 1999), Japanese singer and dancer
- Moa Lignell (born 1994), Swedish singer
- Moa Lundgren (born 1998), Swedish cross-country skier
- Moa Mua Maliepo (born 1996), Romania international rugby union player
- Moa Martinson (1890–1964), Swedish writer
- Moa Matthis (born 1966), Swedish literature critic and author
- Moa Madicken Öberg (born 1995), Swedish fashion model and beauty queen
- Moa Öhman (born 1998), Swedish association football player
- Moa Romanova (born 1992), Swedish cartoonist
- Moa Högdahl Schønningsen (born 1996), Norwegian handball player
- Moa Subong, Indian musician
- Moa Svedenskiöld (born 2003), Swedish professional golfer
- Moa Tsukino (born 1994), Japanese voice actress

== Nickname ==
- Mohammed Abdellaoue (born 1985), Norwegian football player nicknamed "Moa"

== See also ==
- Eber Moas (born 1969), football player from Uruguay
