= Resin-retained bridge =

Type of dental prosthesis

A resin-retained bridge (also known as resin-bonded-bridge or resin-bonded fixed dental prosthesis (RBFDP)) is a bridge (a fixed dental prosthesis) replacing a missing tooth that relies for its retention on a composite resin cement. It is one of many available dental restoration methods which is considered minimally invasive and conservative of tooth tissue. The resin-retained-bridge has gone through a number of iterations. Perhaps the best known is the Maryland bridge and other designs used in the past include the Rochette bridge. The five-year survival rate is around 83.6% and the ten-year rate at 64.9%. The case selection is important and as with any dental prosthesis, good oral hygiene is paramount for success. In recent years, the indications for the use of resin-retained-bridges have diminished significantly and there have been changes in the principles underpinning their design. Resin-retained-bridges should be considered when a fixed prosthesis retained by natural teeth is required. The use has been driven by the advent of evidence-based dentistry showing the benefits to patients of reduced tooth preparation and the importance of an intact enamel structure for the long-term health of the teeth. The bridge is currently in favour in the United Kingdom for these reasons. Indeed, recent contemporary research shows resin retained bridges have better success rates than implants and are a cheaper alternative.

== Types of material used for resin-retained-bridges ==
Traditionally resin-bonded-bridges were composed of ceramic bonded to a substructure made of non-precious metal. In recent years fibre-reinforced and high strength all-ceramic resin-retained-bridges have become popular.

=== Metal framed ===
Conventionally made a substructure that is a non-perforated and sandblasted non-precious metal that is cemented with a chemically active resin cement. A disadvantage to this type of bridge is the appearance of the abutment tooth which can appear grey due to the decreased translucency. The metal substructure can also be visible and will not suit every aesthetic need.

=== Fibre-reinforced composite ===
Bridges made from fibre-reinforced composite are considered to have better aesthetics and adhesion of luting agent to the framework as well as lower costs. Composite is usually fibre-reinforced with glass, ultra-high molecular polyethylene or Kevlar fibres. Areas predicted to have high stress, benefit from having fibres in one direction (unidirectional) which can improve the mechanical properties. These bridges can be fabricated in the mouth during a single visit or indirectly in a dental laboratory. Fracturing and wear of the composite can sometimes be seen.

=== All-ceramic ===
Previously glass-infiltrated aluminium oxide ceramic frameworks have been used. More recently, yttrium tetragonal zirconia polycrystal-based materials such as Lava (3M ESPE) and Cercon (Degudent) have come into use. These frameworks can be designed by wax-ups or using CAD/CAM. The main advantage of this type of bridge is the aesthetics as well as good biocompatibility and lower levels of plaque accumulation. Connector dimensions, however, are greater than those needed for in the other types of resin-retained-bridges.

== Types of designs used for resin-retained-bridges ==
Resin-retained bridges have a variety of designs:

=== Fixed-fixed ===
In this design the connectors are rigid and there are one or more abutments at each end of the span; allowing load to be distributed more equally on abutment teeth.

=== Fixed-movable ===
This design includes one movable connector, allowing differential movement between abutments.

=== Cantilevers ===
This design is simple without the requirement of linking abutments at each end of the bridge span. However, it is the most mechanically unsound out of all the designs as the load is transmitted to one abutment.

=== Complex or hybrid ===
Complex bridge is the traditional term to describe fixed prosthesis with different types of bridge making up the overall prosthesis. More modernly, the term hybrid has been used as it permits the inclusion of fixed prosthesis using a variety of both designs and retainers.

== Principles of design for resin-retained-bridges ==
A resin-retained bridge requires a very specific set of design principles. The following should be followed when designing the bridge:

- Design should be kept as simple as possible
- Should cover as much of the abutment tooth or teeth as possible
- Be rigid
- Permit the control of the occlusal contacts

== Components ==
=== Framework ===
A resin-bonded bridge consists of a cast metal framework that is cemented with resin composite to an abutment(s) which has preparation(s) confined either entirely or almost entirely to enamel.

=== Wing or retainer ===
The wing or retainer must be rigid and is usually fabricated from a metal alloy. The inner surface must fit closely to the abutment tooth. The intaglio is treated in some way to enhance the micromechanical adhesion between the prosthesis and the composite resin cement. In the past various methods have been used, ranging from metal-weave patterns to tin plating. The modern resin-retained bridge retaining wing is usually sandblasted with an alumina powder. The metal wing needs to engage as much of the sound enamel. In the majority of cases the metal wing is taken to the incisal edge of anterior teeth and overlapping of the occlusal (biting) surface of the teeth for posterior teeth.

=== Pontic ===
The pontic is usually made from dental porcelain. The whole restoration is thus a porcelain fused to metal restoration.

=== Cementation ===
Current cement brands commonly used for this procedure include Panavia and Nexus. The use of Panavia is shown to have a higher survival rate compared to other luting cements. All are either autocure or dual-cure luting cements to ensure complete polymerisation of the resin under the wing. Great care must be taken during cementation to avoid contamination of the operative field as this will lower the bond strength of the cement and lead to premature failure. For this reason rubber dam is often advocated for placement, though this can bring its own difficulties. In the majority of cases, with good four-handed dentistry, rubber dam is not required and does not improve success.

== Complications ==
One major advantage of the resin-retained bridge over a conventional bridge is the failure mode is likely to be debonding of the retainer. In conventional bridges, the failure mode is likely to be complete fracture of the abutment tooth with difficult-to-manage sequelae, possibly requiring root canal treatment. With a resin-retained bridge the prosthesis can usually be cleaned off and rebonded in position with minimal inconvenience to the patient.

There are a number of complications from resin-retained-bridges, the most common being debonding and porcelain fracture.

- Debonding
- Porcelain fracture
- Caries
- Framework fracture
- Root resorption
- Retained cusp fracture
- Loss of abutment due to periodontitis
- Minor rotation
