= Arimoto =

Arimoto (written 有本) is a Japanese surname. Notable people with the surname include:

- Hikoroku Arimoto (有本 彦六, 1915–1945), Japanese artistic gymnast
- Kinryū Arimoto (有本 欽隆, 1940–2019), Japanese voice actor
- Moa Arimoto (有本 もあ, born 1986), Japanese actress and model
