= Mua =

Mua or MUA may refer to:

== People ==
- Mua (title), a chiefly title of Rotuma
- Mua people, an indigenous Australian Torres Strait Island people
- Dickson Mua (born 1972), Solomon Islands politician
- Metuisela Mua, Fijian intelligence officer and politician

== Places ==
- Mua, Malawi, a village in Dedza District
- Mua District, Wallis and Futuna, France
- Mua mine, Torre de Moncorvo, Bragança, Portugal

== Other uses ==
- Air Force Meritorious Unit Award of the United States Air Force
- Ala-Too International University in Bishkek, Kyrgyzstan
- Mail user agent, or email client
- Make-up artist
- Manipulation under anesthesia, a chiropractic technique
- Maricas Unidas Argentinas, an early queer organization
- Maritime Union of Australia, an Australian labor union
- Marvel: Ultimate Alliance, a video game
- McGill University Archives
- Medical University of the Americas – Nevis, in Saint Kitts and Nevis
- Miss University Africa, a beauty pageant
- Mundang language
- Musicians' Union of Australia
- Multi-unit abutment, a type of dental implant
- Moslem Unity Association

== See also ==
- Mu'a (disambiguation)
