= Murder of Marcelo Arruda =

On July 9, 2022, city guard and Workers' Party treasurer Marcelo Arruda was murdered by Jorge José da Rocha Guaranho, a federal prison officer and supporter of Jair Bolsonaro, in Foz do Iguaçu, Paraná. The incident received international coverage as emblematic of the climate of polarization and political violence in the 2022 Brazilian general election cycle.

== Background ==
Marcelo Aloizio de Arruda (Foz do Iguaçu, July 9, 1972 – Foz do Iguaçu, July 9, 2022) was raised in the Bancários favela, and began working as a shoeshine boy. In 2003, he graduated from college in Biology. He was a candidate for vice-mayor of Foz do Iguaçu in 2020 for the Workers' Party. In a report by lawyer and law professor Fábio Aristimunho Vargas for BBC News, on May 14, he and Arruda spoke at the Youth Against Violence Workshop, where Arruda argued that "left-wing police officers like him would be the first victims in a possible authoritarian escalation in the country, (...) to prevent them from passing on strategic knowledge to a democratic resistance." At the time of his death, Arruda was the party treasurer, a city guard for 28 years, and director of the Foz City Employees Union (Sismufi). He was married and had four children, including a one-month-old baby. On July 9, 2022, Arruda celebrated his 50th birthday at a party themed after the Workers' Party and former Brazilian president Luiz Inácio Lula da Silva. The celebration was held at the headquarters of the Itaipu Physical Security Sports Association, in Vila A. The event started at 6 pm.

Jorge José da Rocha Guaranho has been a federal prison police officer since 2010, and described himself on social media as Christian, conservative, pro-life, pro-gun, and a Bolsonarista. On his social media, most of his posts are in support of Bolsonaro and his agendas, and include criticisms of Rede Globo and Alexandre de Moraes; as well as a selfie with Eduardo Bolsonaro. In 2018, Guaranho was detained for contempt of military police in Guapimirim, Rio de Janeiro. He was even subject to an internal investigation, which was shelved. In October 2019, he had a disagreement with security guards at a party in Capanema, Paraná, where a report was filed by the Military Police. There was no conviction in either case. He was studying medicine at Cidade do Leste, in Paraguay. He was secretary of the board of the Itaipu Physical Security Sports Association, where Arruda's birthday party was being held, but did not know him previously and had not been invited to the event.

== Crime ==
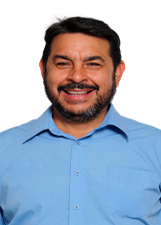
Arruda as a vice-Mayor campaign candidate in 2020.

Marcelo Arruda's birthday party was taking place on the premises of a club made up of public and private security agents, which had recently installed surveillance cameras throughout the premises. Around 9 pm, Márcio Jacob Muller Murback, one of the club's directors, accessed CCTV footage on his cell phone and watched Arruda's party about 700 meters away. Márcio was accompanied by Guaranho. In his testimony, Márcio Murback said that Jorge Guaranho initially did not react after seeing the images on his cell phone, and that he was for about 3 more hours at the Assemib barbecue. After that, Guaranho left Assemib and went to Arruda's birthday party at Aresf.

Security camera footage shows a car, driven by Maranho, maneuvering before Arruda's birthday party at 11:40 pm. Guaranho was not known to anyone at the party and had not been invited. A woman (Guaranho's wife) and a small child (his son) were also in the car. According to police chief initially heading the investigation, Iane Cardoso, Guaranho was playing a pro-Bolsonaro song in the car. Arruda goes up to the driver trying to talk to him, who appears to yell at Arruda. According to witnesses, Guaranho voiced his support for President Bolsonaro. Arruda then grabs a handful of dirt from a nearby flowerbed and throws it at the driver, who in turn pulls out a gun and points it at Arruda. At that moment, Arruda's wife approaches the vehicle, trying to talk to those involved. Guaranho's wife, inside the vehicle, opens the back door, asks her husband to stop, and begs them to leave. As other guests approach, Guaranho leaves the place, accelerating his vehicle abruptly.

The same security camera shows Guaranho returning to the scene at 11:51 pm. He arrives alone, parks his vehicle, and gets out, brandishing a gun. Arruda's wife, at the entrance, flashes her police badge and orders Guaranho to lower his weapon, but he ignores her. They argue briefly while Guaranho aims towards the inside of the party, he then shoots a few times and runs into the place. In the closed-circuit monitoring images, it can be seen that, when hit by one of the shots fired by Guaranho, Arruda puts his hand at waist height and falls to the floor, crawling in search of shelter under a table. The shooter then enters the location, ready to execute Arruda, who was bent over on the ground. However, a last-minute intervention by Arruda's wife throws the shooter off balance and knocks him to the ground, but not before Guaranho manages to fire a close-range shot at Arruda. At this point, the victim begins to return fire, but Guaranho tries to get up and flee toward the back door, but is shot multiple times until he falls backward to the ground. After the shooting ends, some men approach the location and begin kicking Guaranho upon noticing the criminal was still trying to move.

Military Police and Fire Department personnel arrived at the scene around midnight. Arruda and Guaranho were taken to Foz do Iguaçu City Hospital. At 4:25 am, Arruda's death was confirmed. His body was laid to rest in the late afternoon of the 10th, and high-ranking Workers' Party officials, such as party president Gleisi Hoffmann, participated in the wake. Arruda's body was buried at 3:30 pm the following day, at Jardim São Paulo Cemetery, in Foz do Iguaçu, with the event attended by hundreds.

=== da Silva's version ===
Guaranho's wife, Francielle Sales da Silva, denied the political nature of the crime and claimed the encounter between Arruda and Guaranho was merely coincidental. According to her, her husband was patrolling the club when the crime occurred, and Guaranho was initially provoked by Arruda, who was listening to a pro-Bolsonaro song. da Silva held that her husband did not expect to be greeted aggressively, as she had been told there were many police officers at Arruda's party. She testified her husband only flashed his gun when Arruda threw dirt at the car, and that he was very upset when people from inside the party allegedly threw dirt and rocks at the car, which caused him to leave with his family, but also led him to return to the scene to "settle the matter." She claimed that her husband was not a right-wing extremist, and that the true fanatic was Arruda.

The club's directors confirmed in their statements that these patrols were commonplace, but its president said that only the caretaker could accurately determine the frequency of Guaranho's patrols. When questioned, the caretaker replied he remembered the suspect having carried out only one of these patrols, about eight months earlier. Guaranho had been the secretary to the club, but had left the board around the same time, according to his colleagues. A police report refuted the hypothesis that Arruda had thrown stones at the car.

== Investigation ==
The Secretary of Public Security of Foz do Iguaçu, Marcos Antonio Jahnke, decried the killing and stated Civil Police would investigate the motives behind the crime: "From what we understood, it was political intolerance." A Special Parliamentary Commission was created to follow the case. Initially, Paraná Civil Police had reported that Guaranho had died. However, on the afternoon of July 10, it rectified the information, saying he was hospitalized in serious condition, and on July 12, the Paraná Public Security Secretariat announced he was under sedatives in hospital, with no discharge date. The police chief investigating the case, Iane Cardoso, received criticism because, in her first interview, she called Guaranho a "victim". Additionally, posts against the Workers' Party were found on her social media. On the morning of July 11, it was announced the state government had replaced her with the homicide division police chief Camila Cecconello. The official reason for the replacement, according to the state Public Security Secretariat's press office, is that "the homicide division has more resources and experience to handle this situation."

On July 11, at the request of the Public Prosecutor's Office of Paraná, a justice court issued an arrest warrant for Guaranho. On the 15th, chief Cecconello wrapped up the investigation and ruled out the possibility the murder constituted a political crime. As such, the investigation and possible proceedings against Guaranho would be carried out based on the precept that he committed a common crime. This was met with multiple criticisms from the victim's family, criminal law experts, and the Workers' Party. Lawyers for the family considered launching an international investigation to determine the facts.

On July 17, the Paraná State Secretariat of Public Security announced there was no provision for classifying the murder as political, as the old National Security Law was repealed by the Law on Crimes against the Democratic State of Law, which does not classify the situation. The agency supported the investigation published by the Civil Police and defended itself by claiming it is a technical institution and that "political opinions or manifestations are outside of its attributions expressed in the Constitution."

On July 19, Judge Gustavo Germano Francisco Arguello returned the investigation to Civil Police, requesting new information. The requested reports refer to the ballistics confrontation, video recorder analysis, analysis of the investigated person's cell phone, motor vehicle and the place of death. Then, on the 20th, state prosecutors indicted Garanho for homicide doubly qualified by futile motive and common danger. The political motivation for the crime was also highlighted, contradicting the version offered by chief Cecconello. Guaranho was given ten days to present his defense and had the right to call up to eight witnesses.

On the same date, Guaranho left hospital, after showing signs of awareness and health, but remaining under the watch of Military Police. Guaranho had bullet fragments in his head and was shot in the mouth, arms and left leg, in addition to being grazed in the neck. A day later, at the request of the Public Prosecutor's Office, family members and the two defense attorneys were allowed to visit him. On the same day, Justice Arguello accepted the Public Prosecutor's Office's indictment. On July 25, the judge imposed a two-day deadline for Guaranho's cell phone to be examined. On August 1, defense attorney Luciano Santoro stated his client had no memory of the crime because of the head injuries caused by the kicks he received.

On August 4, the state Court denied a house arrest request for Guaranho claiming his health is fragile, a request that was denied again on August 10. On the same day, Guaranho was discharged from hospital. Justice Arguello again denied the request, as he would have preferred Guaranho to be held at the prison medical complex, but the Public Security Department argued the complex could not guarantee the defendant's safety, as it was undergoing physical restructuring and staffing. Furthermore, Guaranho would require the supervision of a nutritionist and a speech therapist, professionals not employed at the complex. Therefore, Arguello approved provisional house arrest. Marcelo's family published a letter stating that "the possibility of the murderer having his arrest revoked or converted to house arrest causes us perplexity and fear, given the dangerousness posed by an individual who had the audacity to commit such an extreme act of disregard for the life of a human being." Lawyers for Arruda's family warned of the possibility of Guaranho fleeing to Paraguay, as the guard was studying medicine in Ciudad del Este, which borders Foz do Iguaçu. The family asked for support from the state legislature, which responded that it will ensure that all court decisions are complied with. In the coming weeks, Alep would hold meetings with the Secretary of Public Security of Paraná, the attorney general of the republic, and pay a visit to the medical prison complex. Protesters rallied to the hospital against Guaranho. On August 12, his house arrest was revoked after the Paraná State Public Security Department corrected its previous statement, stating the CMP is able to house Guaranho. Justice Xisto Pereira, responsible for denying Guaranho's habeas corpus, refuted all of the defense's arguments, including that the officer posed no risk to public order. Among the justifications for the refusal is the proximity of election day and the need to avoid the appearance of impunity.

On August 25, the deadline for the defense's analysis finished, so an extension was requested. The defense argued the other reports were still in need of being produced, and that it would prove Guaranho did not commit homicide based on the chronological order of the facts. The first hearing was scheduled for September 14 by teleconference.

Witnesses reported receiving threats. The Public Prosecutor's Office said it was working on the matter.

In the first hearing, ten people summoned by the prosecution and one by the defense were heard. Among those summoned were Guaranho himself, his wife, Francielle Sales da Silva, the widow Pamela Silva, and friends of Arruda's. On the second day, the defense witnesses and the defendant were heard. The hearings were attended by defense attorneys for both parties and two prosecutors. Even though he was summoned, Guaranho did not testify, as the defense argued that he had lost his memory due to the kicks he received. A hearing was scheduled for the 28th, after the completion of the report on the murder scene.

On October 19, the state prosecutor's office submitted a document requesting that Guaranho's preventive detention be maintained and reiterating the political nature of the crime, which had already been recognized by the Superior Court of Justice. His sentence also received the aggravating factor of putting the lives of other partygoers in danger, and it was argued the defendant should be tried by a jury trial.

On December 1, Justice arguello reckoned the crime was politically motivated, and determined that Guaranho should receive a jury trial, with the possibility of an appeal.

On February 13, 2023, the Court ordered Guaranho to pay a pension of R$1,312.16 to each of Arruda's children. The pension was suspended by a federal court at the request of the Attorney General's Office on April 17, on the understanding that other transfers made by the government to the family, such as Arruda's wife's salary, were not analyzed.

State Justice Benjamim Acácio de Moura e Costa, in a hearing in July 2024, declared the defendant was the real victim, not ruling out the hypothesis of self-defense. In the sentence, Mouro e Costa said that: "The victim who died is a violent human being, perhaps as much as the defendant. […] This is clear, there is no argument. The young man [defendant], today, seems to be a soft-mouth, he has all his movement hindered, he is a person who has had a reduction in virility, he has become a wimp." The judge defended closing the criminal proceeding and an investigation of Arruda's widow.

On September 12, 2024, the state court authorized house arrest with the use of an electronic ankle bracelet for Guaranho. On the following day, the defendant left prison.

=== Investigative reports ===
An expert report indicates Guaranho fired three shots, while Arruda fired thirteen times. Both weapons used were semi-automatic pistols in perfect condition, the .40 being Guaranho's and the .380 being Arruda's. The report from the police experts refutes the version of the defendant's wife, that her car had been stoned. The security camera report shows that two days after the crime, someone remotely erased the access logs, but the footage is preserved and unaltered.

=== Parallel investigations ===
==== Assault on Jorge Guaranho ====
The Civil Police of Paraná opened an investigation as to whether a crime was perpetrated by three individuals who kicked the murderer Jorge Guaranho in the head and ribs while he was lying on the ground, shortly after being shot by his victim.

==== Claudinei Coco Esquarcini ====
In his testimony, a security guard stated that it is unusual for unauthorized individuals to access the camera, and that the person responsible for granting access was Claudinei Coco Esquarcini, the club's director. Esquarcini and Guaranho knew each other, and it is possible that he passed on the images. On July 17, Esquarcini was found dead in the city of Medianeira. Civil Police says it was a suicide. There was speculation that Esquarcini had also been the victim of a crime, but a camera captured the moment he died. Esquarcini threw himself from a road overpass. However, the Civil Police of Paraná is still investigating the connection between the death and the case. On the 20th, the MP requested an investigation of Esquarcini's cell phone.

==== Prison police perks ====
During a hearing with two employees of federal prison, it was revealed the prison officers who were protecting Ganharo during his time in prison had been made available to him at the wife's request. The use of police services was described by the employees as corporatismo. Prosecutors sent a letter to Tânia Maria Matos Ferreira regarding documents detailing the services being provided.

== Trial ==
On February 13, 2025, Guaranho was convicted by the Curitiba Jury Court to 20 years in prison for double-qualified homicide, with base motive and common danger, for the murder of Arruda. The presiding judge, Judge Mychelle Pacheco Cintra Stadler, ordered the immediate imprisonment of the convicted defendant, who had previously been under house arrest. Stadler emphasized that Guaranho committed the crime using a weapon belonging to the Union, that political intolerance motivated the crime, and that the date of the homicide, July 9, was declared in Paraná as the State Day for the Struggle against Political Intolerance and the Promotion of Democratic Tolerance, something that would have been unnecessary to warn about before this crime. The decision can be appealed.

== Reactions ==
=== Politicians ===
- Jair Bolsonaro: in a message on Twitter, he pleaded that "regardless of any findings", those of his voters who support "those who practice violence against opponents should change sides and support the left". Bolsonaro added that "to this kind of people, I ask that, for the sake of consistency, they change sides and support the left, which has an undeniable history of violent episodes". The former President also wrote, "the other side over there that stabs, that spits, that destroys property, that sets off firecrackers at cameramen, that protects international terrorists, that dehumanizes people with labels and calls for them to be set on fire, that invades farms and kills animals, that pushes a man into a moving truck."
- Luiz Inácio Lula da Silva: on his Twitter account, now President Lula wrote that "we need democracy, dialogue, tolerance and peace".
- Gleisi Hoffmann: The president of the Worker's Party attended the victim's wake. On her social media, the congresswoman posted the following message: "It is with deep sadness that I make this video. Another dear comrade passed away this morning. A victim of intolerance, hatred and political violence, celebrating his 50th birthday with family, friends and colleagues in Foz do Iguaçu. Our Marcelo Arruda was murdered by a Bolsonaro supporter."
- Ciro Gomes: Also on his Twitter account, the Democratic Labor Party presidential hopeful argued that "political hatred needs to be contained to prevent us from having a tragedy of gigantic proportions. May God, in his mercy, intercede on behalf of us Brazilians, pacifying our souls, and bringing comfort to the two families destroyed in this absurd war."
- Simone Tebet: In a statement, the Brazilian Democratic Movement presidential candidate and now minister of the Lula administration posted: "I deeply regret the violent deaths in Foz do Iguaçu. I sympathize with the families of both. But the fact is that this type of situation cruelly and dramatically exposes how unacceptable the intensification of political polarization that is advancing in Brazil is. This type of conflict threatens us enormously as a society. This is what I fight against and will continue to fight against."
- Rodrigo Pacheco: the Federal Senate president classified the episode as "a pure expression of the moment of political hatred". The next day, Pacheco opened the Senate session with a minute of silence in honor of Arruda.

=== Press ===
The press generally focused on political polarization during the 2022 elections. Bolsonaro, however, accused the press of blaming him for the murder.

The state-owned media outlets Empresa Brasil de Comunicação and TV Brasil omitted the political positions of those involved. EBC published that "Paraná police investigate the death of a city guard in Foz do Iguaçu", and TV Brasil that "City guard is killed after an exchange of gunfire".

=== International Press ===
The international press also covered the story, including the French newspapers Le Parisien and Le Figaro, the Argentine Infobae, the Spanish El País, and the British news agency Reuters. Other media outlets reporting on it are CNN and The Washington Post and the state broadcaster PBS.

== Electoral impact ==
=== Presidential candidates ===
Jair Bolsonaro was doing poorly in the polls for the 2022 presidential election, so his allies insisted that the president abandon his hate speeches. Mediated by representative Otoni de Paula, Bolsonaro held a video call with José and Luiz Arruda, two of Arruda's brothers, who are his supporters. During this video call, the president decried what happened, attacked the left and complained about the way the media had been framing the issue, believing as he did that the case had a negative impact on his reelection campaign in 2022. Finally, the president invited them to a press conference. The Arruda brothers did not say whether they would accept the invitation, but told Bolsonaro that they did not want their brother's death to be exploited politically. Bolsonaro also said that the people who kicked Jorge after the murder were Workers' Party members, but he met with Marcelo's brother again and apologized for spreading fake news. Otoni de Paula says he was responsible for accidentally passing on the wrong information to the president.

Upon learning of the existence of the video call through the press, the widow called it "absurd" and stated that the president is distorting the real story by saying that the killer did not go to the party for political reasons. Presidential candidate Luiz Inácio Lula da Silva criticized the meeting, saying it was politically motivated. The SECOM banned the release of the video to avoid bringing electoral connotations to the meeting.

Due to the political violence, the Federal Police rated Lula's security at maximum risk and decided to bring forward and increase his protection during the elections. In an interview with "Uol", Lula reiterated that he does not fear attempts on his life but that Bolsonaro is responsible for Marcelo's murder.

=== Parties ===
On July 12, Lula's pre-campaign coalition submitted a request to the attorney general of the Republic (PGR) that the charges related to Arruda's murder be referred to the Federal Court. On the same day, the attorney general received another request, this time from congressmen from opposition parties, asking that President Jair Bolsonaro be investigated for the crime of inciting hatred and violence.

Concerned about the escalation of political violence during the election, several opposition parties signed a request that a bill be analysed proposing the right to bear guns in the week before the election and in the next 7 days be suspended. Representatives sent a query on July 13, 2022, to Minister Alexandre de Moraes of the Superior Electoral Court (TSE), probing the possibility of this court prohibiting that armed people circulate in polling stations and electoral sessions, establishing that the bearing weapons in these places be restricted to personnel of Brazilian security forces.

The consultation on a gun ban at polling stations was submitted to the TSE along with two representations filed by the opposition parties. The first of these representations requests that the TSE adopt measures to prevent and punish cases of political violence. The second representation requests that the Court order Bolsonaro to refrain from engaging in hate speech or incitement to violence, even if veiled, and that the head of the Executive be required to "clearly and unequivocally" condemn all acts of discrimination and political violence on his social media, starting with the murder of Arruda. The representation also requests that Bolsonaro be fined R$1 million if he commits such acts. On July 20, 2022, Minister Alexandre de Moraes received the representations from the TSE and ordered President Jair Bolsonaro to comment on them within 48 hours. On the same day, the president's defense argued that Jair Bolsonaro cannot be held responsible for the actions of his supporters, as he does not control them.

On July 25, the Human Rights Committee of the Chamber of Represenratives forwarded a document to the United Nations along with thirteen other reports of political violence carried out by Bolsonaro supporters, including two other murders. They are Moa do Katendê, stabbed to death in 2018, and Antônio Carlos Rodrigues Furtado, punched and kicked to death in 2019. Both were killed by Bolsonaro supporters during arguments about politics.

On August 9, the Attorney General's Office told the press that it would not federalize the case as the investigation deadlines were met, public agencies did their job efficiently, and there was little chance of Brazil being held internationally accountable for human rights violations.

== See also ==
- Attempted assassination of Jair Bolsonaro
- Moa do Katendê
