= Dental laboratory =

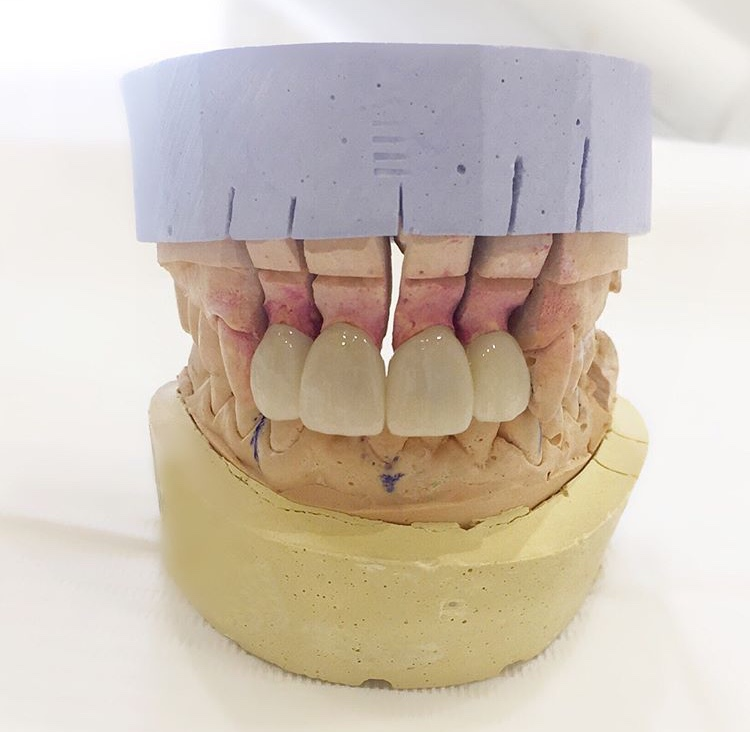
Fabrication of aesthetic porcelain crowns in the dental laboratory

Dental laboratories manufacture or customize a variety of products to assist in the provision of oral health care by a licensed dentist. These products include crowns, bridges, dentures and other dental products. Dental lab technicians follow a prescription from a licensed dentist when manufacturing these items, which include prosthetic devices (such as denture teeth and implants) and therapeutic devices (such as orthodontic devices). The FDA regulates these products as medical devices and they are therefore subject to FDA's good manufacturing practice ("GMP") and quality system ("QS") requirements. In most cases, however, they are exempt from manufacturer registration requirements. Some of the most common restorations manufactured include crowns, bridges, dentures, and dental implants. Dental implants is one of the most advanced dental technologies in the field of dentistry.

Certification in the dental laboratory profession is strictly voluntary. Laboratories who have taken the extra steps to become certified represent the top of their field. The most easily obtainable certification is the CDL (Certified Dental Laboratory). A Certified Dental Laboratory has met standards in personnel skill, training, infection control, tracking mechanisms and good business and manufacturing practices. The certification is based on a third party review of photos of the facility. The next tier for certification is DAMAS (Dental Appliance Manufacturers Audit Scheme). DAMAS requires a third party on-site inspection. Based on international standards for the manufacturing of medical devices, the DAMAS certification ensures the lab environment operates in such a way as to ensure product and patient safety. It provides a formula for improved documentation of many aspects of dental lab activity (from dental prescriptions to material traceability). DAMAS standards mirror the FDA's quality system and good manufacturing practice standards, which all domestic dental laboratories must comply with.

The highest level of manufacturing certifications available to dental laboratories are through the ISO "International Organization for Standardization". The ISO develops standards through the consensus of standards organizations from 161 countries. Members represent both the public and private sectors of countries around the world. ISO standards are thought to represent the best interests and needs of the broader global society. ISO 9001 is a set of standards for quality management systems. ISO 13485 is a set of standards, published in 2003, that represents the requirements for a comprehensive management system for the design and manufacture of medical devices. It emphasizes meeting regulatory requirements and managing risk in order to ensure the production of safe design and distribution of medical devices. Product documentation is thorough and covers the entire life cycle of product design, manufacture and post-delivery. Although not considered a substitute, ISO 13485 will align a dental lab's management system not only with the FDA QS-GMP regulation, but various other regulatory requirements found throughout the world.

== National Association of Dental Laboratories ==
The National Association of Dental Laboratories (NADL) was formed in the United States in 1951 after the merger of Dental Laboratory Institute of America and the American Dental Laboratory Association. It became a federation of state commercial dental laboratory associations. This merger took place in Chicago and then, in 1952, NADL established its headquarters offices in Washington, D.C., which were moved to Tallahassee, Florida later in 2001.

The association was known as the National Association of Certified Dental Laboratories from 1968 to 1971 when it changed back to its original name. Its mission is to be the recognized advocate for the dental laboratory technology industry by promoting professionalism, setting technical standards and providing valued services to its membership. The stated purpose of NADL is to uphold and advance the dignity, honor and efficiency of those engaged as operators of dental laboratories, to advance their standards of service to the dental profession and to establish cooperation among its members.

NADL offers several benefits to its members and one of such benefits is that it promotes high standards and aims to work as a unified voice for the dental laboratory trade. NADL establishes alliances with professional businesses to benefit its members with either discounts or services. Members also benefit from NADL's educational programs ranging from seminars, conferences, materials, the NADL University which offers a Certificate in Dental Laboratory Management, to the Wealth of Knowledge Videotape Library. These programs inform and educate NADL members on topics such as production, marketing, and promotion, and also serve as continuing education credits. Furthermore, this association offers the NADL Pillar Scholarship aimed to provide qualified dental technicians the opportunity to take the necessary examinations to complete the Certified Dental Technician examination process.

NADL also has its set of communications tools to keep its members informed about the industry trends. Two examples are the Journal of Dental Technology (JDT), a journal published 9 times a year, and JDT Unbound, a mail newsletter that includes regular updates.

Its Board of Directors comprises 14 members and its current President is Robert Savage. NADL also has an independent board, the National Board for Certification in Dental Laboratory Technology, founded in 1955 as an independent certification organization. It administered the first Certified Dental Technician (CDT) tests in October 1958 and awarded the first CDT certificates in March of the following year.

CDTs can retain certification if they apply to the NBC every year for renewal and prove they have complied with the local laws governing their work and undergone continuing technical education. They are also required to pay a renewal fee.

== NADL regulations ==
It is in NADL best interests to protect the patients' health and assure their restorations are safe for use. To fulfill this objective, NADL has supported federal and state regulations since 2003 and has worked close with the U.S. Food and Drug Administration (FDA), state health officials and the dental industry as well. It has also developed regulatory guidelines aimed to be a basic standard of regulation. Although its main objective is to benefit the general public it is also intended to be effective for the dental technicians and the dental industry. One of the requests from NADL to the FDA has been to protect patient's safety. In this sense, the Association intends that the source of dental devices be disclosed to the patient.

NADL has expressed its support to establish mandatory certification and continuing education for dental technicians dedicated to restoration manufacture; mandatory registration of all dental laboratories with the competent authority; mandatory documentation of those materials used in any restoration and their point of origin; as well as mandatory documentation of the mentioned items in the patient's dental records.

In their Guidelines for Establishing Statutory Regulation, NADL has noted that certification is a way to recognize individuals who have met established qualifications, therefore, they should be the only ones legally acknowledged to use the designated title.

== Dental Lab Certification in the UK ==
All Dental Technicians and Clinical Dental Technicians in the UK are required by law to be registered with the General Dental Council (GDC). The GDC is an organisation which regulates all dentists and dental care professionals, they set and maintain standards in UK dentistry.

Many of those who work for Dental Laboratories are also registered with the Dental Technologists Association (DTA). The DTA is a professional association representing the interests of dental technicians in the UK.

The GDC ensures that dental professionals have the necessary qualifications and are trained to the necessary levels. Dental technicians must prove their knowledge is up-to-date by taking part in Continuing Professional Development (CPD).
