= Clione no Akari =

2012 novel

- Lights of the Clione
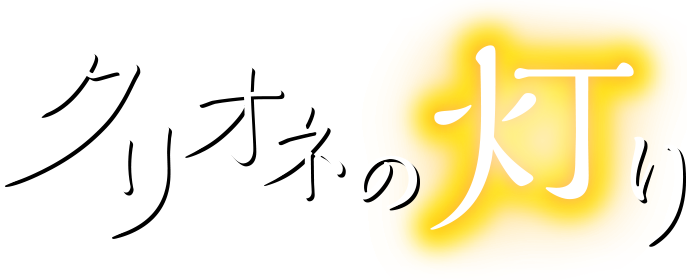
- Clione no akari Logo

クリオネの灯り (Kurione no Akari)
- Novel
- Written by: Natural-Rain
- Published by: East Press
- Published: June 25, 2012
- Anime television series
- Directed by: Naoya Ishikawa
- Written by: Takeshi Onaka
- Music by: Kazuhiko Izu
- Studio: Drop
- Licensed by: Amazon Prime Video (expired)
- Original network: AT-X, Tokyo MX, Sun TV, GYT, RNB, RNC, MMT, BS Fuji, FCT
- Original run: July 12, 2017 – September 27, 2017
- Episodes: 12

Clione no Akari (クリオネの灯り, Kurione no Akari; lit. 'Clione's Light') is a Japanese online novel by Natural-Rain. It was originally posted online in 2004, and was published in June 2012 by East Press. An anime television series adaptation by Drop aired from July 12 to September 27, 2017. The series is entirely directed and animated by Naoya Ishikawa.

== Characters ==
Minori Amamiya (ミノリ/雨宮 実, Amamiya Minori)
Voiced by: Sayuri Matsumura
Takashi Aoi (タカシ/碧井 方, Aoi Takashi)
Voiced by: Shunya Ōhira
Kyōko Tsukihashi (キョウコ/月橋 杏子, Tsukihashi Kyōko)
Voiced by: Natsuko Hara
Gen Isozaki (ゲン/磯崎 源, Isozaki Gen)
Voiced by: Yūki Fujita
Kōsuke Okishima (コウスケ/沖島 航介, Okishima Kōsuke)
Voiced by: Misaki Ōhashi
Shōta Sayama (ショウタ/砂山翔太, Sayama Shōta)
Voiced by: Moa Tsukino
Nanami Yukine (ナナミ/雪音 七海, Yukine Nanami)
Voiced by: Rico Sasaki
Yuna Nagino (ユナ/凪乃 遊夏, Nagino Yuna)
Voiced by: Riho Iida
Kaho Ichinose (カホ/一ノ瀬 佳帆, Ichinose Kaho)
Voiced by: Aina Suzuki
Sayaka Hama (サヤカ/浜 沙耶花, Hama Sayaka)
Voiced by: Akari Kageyama
Inoue-sensei/Sakura Inoue (いのうえ 先生/井上 桜, Inoue Sakura)
Voiced by: Kana Aoi

== Media ==
=== Anime ===
An anime television series adaptation by Drop aired from July 12 to September 27, 2017. The series is entirely directed and animated by Naoya Ishikawa. The opening theme is "Clione no Akari" (クリオネの灯り, Kurione no Akari) and the ending theme is "Sora o Tobu Kaze" (空ヲ飛ブ風), both performed by former SKE48 member Aki Deguchi. It was streamed exclusively on Amazon Prime Video.

No.	Title (Note: All English titles are taken from Amazon Video.)	Original release date
1	"All Alone"; Transliteration: "Hitoribotchi" (Japanese: 独りぼっち)	July 12, 2017
2	"Promise"; Transliteration: "Yakusoku" (Japanese: 約束)	July 19, 2017
3	"Courage"; Transliteration: "Yūki" (Japanese: 勇気)	July 26, 2017
4	"The Aquarium"; Transliteration: "Suizokukan" (Japanese: 水族館)	August 2, 2017
5	"See You Tomorrow"; Transliteration: "Mata ashita" (Japanese: また明日)	August 9, 2017
6	"One Hundred Days' Flower"; Transliteration: "Hyaku nichi no hana" (Japanese: 百日の花)	August 16, 2017
7	"The Bustling Festival"; Transliteration: "Matsuri no Nigiwai" (Japanese: 祭の賑わい)	August 23, 2017
8	"A Tiny Lighthouse"; Transliteration: "Chīsana tōdai" (Japanese: 小さな灯台)	August 30, 2017
9	"The Lighthouse and the Tetrapods"; Transliteration: "Tōdai to Tetorapoddo" (Japanese: 灯台とテトラポッド)	September 6, 2017
10	"After the Festival, The Morning Light"; Transliteration: "Matsuri no Nochi, Asa no Hikari" (Japanese: 祭りの後、朝の光)	September 13, 2017
11	"Memories of the Future"; Transliteration: "Mirai no Omoide" (Japanese: 未来の想い出)	September 20, 2017
12	"Lights of the Clione"; Transliteration: "Kurione no Akari" (Japanese: クリオネの灯り)	September 27, 2017
