= Ante's law =

In dentistry, Ante's law is a postulate about crown-to-root ratio put forth by Irwin H. Ante in a thesis paper he wrote in 1926.

Ante's law states that "the total periodontal membrane area of the abutment teeth must equal or exceed that of the teeth to be replaced."

Later claims were made that "the length of the periodontal membrane attachment of the abutment tooth should be at least one half to two thirds of that of its normal root attachment".

Because of these unsubstantiated, empirical concepts, many teeth were subsequently excluded from suitability as an abutment for fixed partial dentures and double abutments became a popular means of complying with Ante's law.

Ante's law has not been confirmed by long-term clinical trials.
