= To Be Hero =

Japanese & Chinese co-produced animated TV series

- Japanese title card of the show
- Created by: Li Haoling
- Anime television series
- Directed by: Shinichi Watanabe; Li Haoling
- Produced by: Lu Xingcheng
- Written by: Li Haoling
- Music by: Kyōichi Miyazaki; Takagō Azuma; Hisayuki Shimizu; Lin Heye
- Studio: Studio LAN; Emon
- Licensed by: Crunchyroll (streaming); NA: Discotek Media (home video)
- Original network: Tokyo MX (Japan); Bilibili (China)
- Original run: October 5, 2016 – December 21, 2016
- Episodes: 12
- Anime television series

To Be Heroine
- Directed by: Li Haoling
- Produced by: Li Haoling
- Written by: Li Haoling
- Music by: Kyōichi Miyazaki; Takagō Azuma; Hisayuki Shimizu; Gui Ziyou; Shi Yin; Fang Wen; Chen Ji; Yang Bingyin; Li Muye
- Studio: Studio LAN; Haoliners Animation League
- Licensed by: Crunchyroll (streaming); NA: Discotek Media (home video)
- Original network: Tokyo MX (Japan); Bilibili (China)
- Original run: May 19, 2018
- Episodes: 7 (Japan); 12 (China)
- Related works
- To Be Hero X

To Be Hero (Japanese: トゥー・ビー・ヒーロー; Chinese: 凸变英雄) is a Japanese-Chinese superhero comedy animated television series and media franchise created by Li Haoling. The first season of the show was co-produced and animated by Studio LAN and Haoliners Animation League's Japanese branch Emon under the supervision of Shinichi Watanabe. It premiered in October 2016, on Tokyo MX in Japan, and on video sharing website bilibili in China.

A second series named To Be Heroine premiered in 2018. The series was directed by Li Haoling and animated by Studio LAN and Haoliners Animation League.

A third series titled To Be Hero X, primarily animated by three studios (Studio LAN, Pb Animation Co., Ltd., and Paper Plane Animation Studio) under BeDream, premiered in April 2025. The series was co-produced by BeDream, Bilibili, and Aniplex.

== Synopsis ==
The series follows Ossan, a 38 year old toilet designer living an ordinary life along with his daughter, Min-San. Following a bizarre event that drastically alters his appearance, he is tasked with protecting the earth as a superhero, despite lacking any motivation or heroic traits. The show blends action with absurdist comedy, using a superhero narrative to parody familiar anime tropes.

== Production ==
To Be Hero was made as a co-production involving Studio Lan in collaboration with Haoliners Animation League and their Japanese branch, Emon. Japanese production was overseen by Shinichi Watanabe. The series was aired simultaneously to audiences in both Japan and China, Airing on Tokyo MX and bilibili.

== Cast ==
=== Chinese cast ===
- Tute Hameng (Chinese) as Ossan/Yashu
- Shan Xin (Chinese) as Min-chan/Chenmin Jiang (姜 辰敏, Jiāng Chénmǐn)

=== Japanese cast ===
- Kenjiro Tsuda (Japanese) as Ossan/Yashu
- Moa Tsukino (Japanese) as Futaba Hanaya/Yuye Hua (花屋 二葉, Hanaya Futaba)
- Yutaka Aoyama/Li Lu as Yamada
- Tomokazu Sugita
- Takeshi Maeda
- Motoko Kumai (Japanese) as Hikaru Isago/Xiaoguang Sha (沙 光, Isago Hikaru)
- Omi Minami (Japanese) as Tōru Utsubari/Chao Liang (梁 超, Utsubari Tōru)
- Junko Minagawa (Japanese) as Min-chan/Chenmin Jiang (ミンちゃん, Min-chan)

== Media ==
The production in general took place in Japan and China, with modifications to the show for both of the Japanese and Chinese broadcasts. The first season aired from October 5 to December 21, 2016, on Tokyo MX. The anime has been licensed by Crunchyroll for its online release. In China, the opening song is "Insistence" (执念), performed by Loki (刘畅). Meanwhile, in Japan, the opening song is "Come to See You" (オープニングテーマ「アイニコイヨ」), performed by BRATS. The ending song in both Japan and China is "My Dad Protects the Earth" (エンディングテーマ「私のパパが地球を守る 〜我爹守护地球〜」) by Lin Heye (林和夜).

A second season of the show entitled To Be Heroine was released on May 19, 2018.

On October 25, 2022, Diskotek Media released To Be Hero and To Be Heroine on a single Blu-Ray, limited to 2000 copies. The release includes both series in Japanese and English. This marked its first home video release outside of Asia.

An animation project titled To Be Hero X had been announced by bilibili and Aniplex in 2022, serving as the show's third season. The series premiered on April 6, 2025, on Fuji TV and other channels. At Anime Expo 2023, Crunchyroll announced that they licensed the series outside of Asia.

The series follows an anthological narrative. The storylines of each season are unrelated apart from sharing a universe and a common superhero theme.

=== Episodes ===
No.	Title	Original air date
1	"First Day as a Superhero"	October 5, 2016
2	"Second Day as a Superhero: Brutal, Brutal, Brutal Death"	October 12, 2016
3	"Third Day as a Superhero: A Leader Really Must"	October 19, 2016
4	"Fourth Day as a Superhero: Eight Different Types of Screams"	October 26, 2016
5	"Fifth Day as a Superhero: Quit Patching It Up With Tape"	November 2, 2016
6	"Sixth Day as a Superhero: A Somewhat Heart-Racing Development"	November 9, 2016
7	"Seventh Day as a Superhero: Inhabitant of the Other World"	November 16, 2016
8	"Eighth Day as a Superhero: I Want Multiple Girlfriends at Once!"	November 23, 2016
9	"Ninth Day as a Superhero: If You'll Do It, I'll Take off My Underwear Right Away"	November 30, 2016
10	"Tenth Day as a Superhero: This Episode Is Low on Laughs and Salt Content"	December 7, 2016
11	"Eleventh Day as a Hero: I am a loser. Please let me die."	December 14, 2016
12	"Stay With Me, Daddy!"	December 21, 2016
