= Moai (disambiguation) =

Moai are large statues of Easter Island.

Moai also may refer to:

- Moai (seamount), submarine volcano type
- Moai kavakava, small wooden statues
- Moai (game development platform)
- Moai (social support groups), Japanese institution

== See also ==
- Moyai statue, a visage of the Moai statues made in and spread around Japan
- Moa (disambiguation)
- MAOI, antidepressant medications
- Maui, Hawaiian island
