= Bridge (dentistry) =

Dental restoration for missing teeth

- ICD-9-CM: 23.42-23.43
- MeSH: D003829

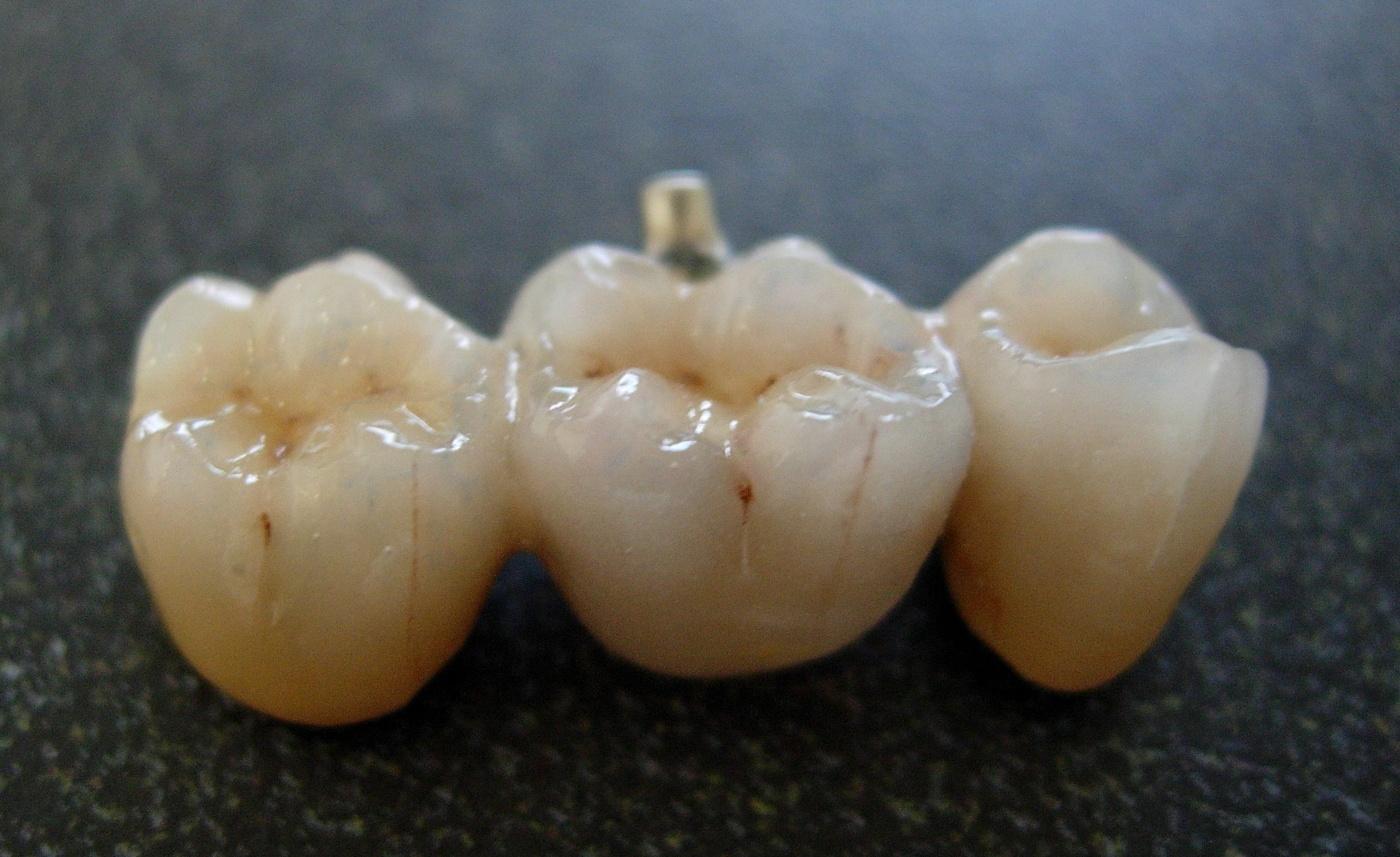
A three unit porcelain fused to metal bridge (PFM) made by a dental technician

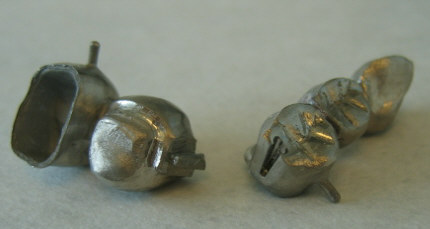
A semi-precision attachment between teeth #3 and #4, with the mortise on #4. Note the lingual buttons extending, in the photo, upward on #2 (on the left) and downward on #4. These are used to grasp the crowns with a hemostat and make them easier to handle. They can also be used to aid in removal of the crown in case there is an excessive amount of retention during the try-in. They are cut off prior to final cementation.

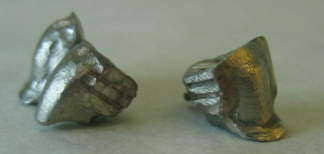
The proximal surfaces of the pre-solder index abutment and pontic, showing lab-processed grooves for added retention of the acrylic resin

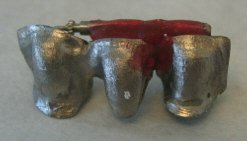
The abutment and pontic joined with acrylic resin in a solder index and reinforced with an old bur (lying horizontally across the occlusal surface of the copings)

A bridge is a fixed dental restoration (a fixed dental prosthesis) used to replace one or more missing teeth by joining an artificial tooth definitively to adjacent teeth or dental implants.

== Definitions ==
Fixed bridge: A dental prosthesis that is definitively attached to natural teeth and replaces missing teeth.

Abutment: The tooth that supports and retains a dental prosthesis.

Pontic: The artificial tooth that replaces a missing natural tooth.

Retainer: The component attached to the abutment for retention of the prosthesis. Retainers can be major or minor.

Unit: Pontics and abutment teeth are referred to as units. The total number of units in a bridge is equal to the number of pontics plus the number of abutment teeth.

Saddle: The area on the alveolar ridge which is edentulous where at least one missing tooth is to be reinstated.

Connector: Joins the pontic to the retainer or two retainers together. Connectors may be fixed or movable.

Span: The length of the alveolar ridge between the natural teeth where the bridge will be placed.

Resin-bonded bridge: A dental prostheses where the pontic is connected to the surface of natural teeth which are either unprepared or minimally prepared.

== Advantages and disadvantages of tooth replacement ==
Advantages	Disadvantages
Restore aesthetics (particularly important for anterior edentulous areas)	Loss of tooth tissue (tooth preparation of abutments often requires significant tooth preparation)
Restore function (mastication, speech)	Pulpal damage (tooth preparation opens dentinal tubules providing a connection between bacteria in the mouth and the pulp. Deep preparations can cause pulpal injury)
Occlusal stability (prevent tilting, drifting, rotation and over-eruption of adjacent/opposing teeth)	Secondary caries (around crown margins, under debonded retainer wings)
Patient preference	Secondary caries (around crown margins, under debonded retainer wings)

== Types of bridge ==
=== Conventional bridge ===
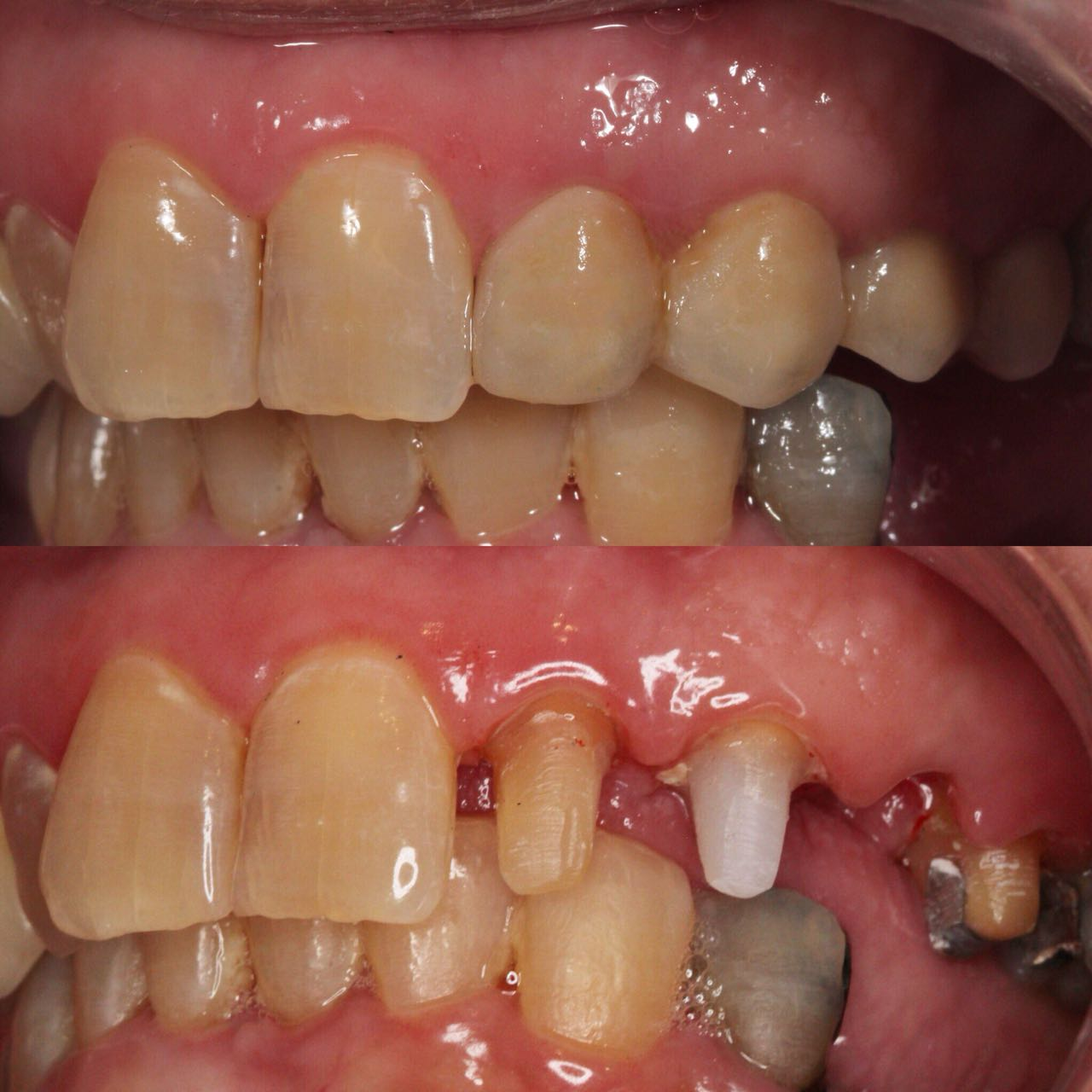
High translucent zirconium fixed–fixed bridge built with VM9 vita porcelain and stained with luster paste. The upper first premolar is considered the pontic and the teeth prepared are abutments.

Conventional bridges are bridges that are supported by full-coverage crowns, three-quarter crowns, post-retained crowns, onlays and inlays on the abutment teeth. In these types of bridges, the abutment teeth require preparation and reduction to support the prosthesis. Conventional bridges are named depending on the way the pontic (false teeth) is attached to the retainer.

==== Fixed–fixed bridges ====
A fixed–fixed bridge refers to a pontic which is attached to a retainer at both sides of the space with only one path of insertion. This type of design has a rigid connector at each end which connects the abutment to the pontic. As the abutments are connected together rigidly, it is critical that during tooth preparation the proximal surfaces of the abutment teeth must be prepared so that they are parallel to each other.

==== Cantilever ====
A cantilever is a bridge where a pontic is attached to a retainer only at one side. The abutment tooth may be mesial or distal to the pontic.

In a spring cantilever, the pontic and retainer are remote from each other and connected by a metal bar. Usually, a missing anterior tooth is replaced and supported by a posterior tooth. This design of bridge has been superseded.

==== Fixed–movable ====
The pontic is firmly attached to a retainer at one end of the span (major retainer) and attached via a movable joint at the other end (minor retainer).

A major advantage of this type of bridge is that the movable joint can accommodate the angulation differences in the abutment teeth in long axis, which enables the path of insertion to be irrespective of the alignment of the abutment tooth. This enables a more conservative approach as the abutments do not need to be prepared to be parallel to one another. Ideally the rigid connector should attach the pontic to the more distal abutment. The movable connector attaches the pontic to the mesial abutment, enabling this abutment tooth limited movement in a vertical direction.

=== Resin-bonded bridge ===
An alternative to the traditional bridge is the resin-bonded or adhesive bridge (also called a Maryland bridge). A resin-bonded bridge utilises retainer "wings" on the sides of the pontic which attach it to the etched enamel of the abutment teeth. Abutment teeth require minor or no preparation. They are most often used when the abutment teeth are whole and sound (i.e., no crowns or major fillings). Single retainer cantilever resin-bonded bridges have less complications than end-to-end resin-bonded bridges with retainer wings on both sides.

=== Combination designs ===
The incorporation of elements of different conventional bridge designs. A popular combination design is the use of a fixed-fixed design with a cantilever.

=== Hybrid designs ===
Bridges that incorporate elements of both conventional and adhesive bridge designs.

== Advantages and disadvantages of conventional bridge designs ==
	Advantages	Disadvantages
Fixed–fixed	1. Maximum strength 2. Very retentive 3. Most accepted design for longer spans 4. Construction is relatively straightforward	1. Preparations must be parallel which may require extensive tooth preparation. Weakens the tooth and risks damaging the pulp 2. Achieving parallel preparations is challenging. It is important to avoid undercuts.; 3. Abutments are major retainers requiring extensive preparation 4. Cemented as one unit which may be challenging
Fixed-movable	1. Non-parallel abutments may be used which avoids extensive tooth preparation 2. Minor retainers are used so the preparations are more conservative of tooth tissue 3. Enables small movements of teeth 4. Cementation is more straightforward as components can be cemented separately	1. Not appropriate for long spans 2. Complex design for the laboratory to construct 3. Temporary bridge is complex to make
Cantilever	1. Only one abutment is required therefore conservative 2. Destructive parallel preparations not required 3. Most appropriate design when replacing anteriors 4. Maintenance and oral hygiene is easier for the patient	1. Span length limited to one pontic due to leverage on the abutment 2. Rigid design to prevent distortion 3. Tilting of abutment teeth due to occlusal forces

== Advantages and disadvantages of resin-bonded bridge designs ==
	Advantages	Disadvantages
Fixed-fixed	1. Large surface area providing good retention 2. Simple to construct in the laboratory	1. Debonding which can allow secondary caries to develop under the failed wing 2. Tilted abutments may require extensive preparation to achieve parallelism and sufficient retention 3. Ideally abutments should be equally retentive which is difficult to achieve, especially posteriorly when the retainers are a molar and premolar
Fixed-movable	1. Abutment teeth are able to move independently 2. The retention of the two retainers does not need to be equal 3. Minor retainer can be minimally retentive 4. Stops tilting of the posterior abutment	1. Design not advised for anterior bridges 2. Design not appropriate for long spans 3. More complex to construct in the laboratory
Cantilever	1. Most conservative of tooth tissue as minimal (if any) preparation required on one abutment only.; 2. Design of choice for replacing single anteriors 3. Can be used for short posterior spans 4. Straightforward to construct in the laboratory 5. Patients are able to maintain good oral hygiene as it is easy to clean	1. Limited retention due to small surface area 2. Risk of debonding due to torquing forces 3. Appropriate positioning on cementation may be complex

== Case selection and treatment planning ==
=== Case selection ===
Appropriate case selection is important when considering the provision of fixed bridgework. Patient expectations should be discussed and a thorough patient history should be obtained. Replacement of missing teeth with fixed bridgework may not always be indicated and both patient factors alongside restorative factors should be considered before deciding if providing fixed bridgework is appropriate. The survival rate of bridgework can be affected by the span of bridge needed, the proposed position of the bridge, and the size, shape, number and condition of planned abutment teeth. Furthermore, any active disease including caries or periodontal disease should be treated and followed by a period of maintenance to ensure patient compliance in maintaining appropriate oral hygiene.

Study models mounted on a semi-adjustable articulator using a facebow record are a useful aid to study occlusion prior to provision of a fixed prosthesis. They may also be used to practice planned tooth preparation. Subsequently, a diagnostic wax-up can be provided to help the patient visualise the final prosthesis and to construct a silicone index. This index can be used to make a temporary prosthesis.

=== Selection and evaluation of abutment teeth ===
Multiple factors influence the selection of appropriate abutment teeth. These include the size of potential abutment tooth, with larger teeth having an increased surface area preferable for retention, using teeth with a stable periodontal status, favourable tooth angulation, favourable tooth position, and an adequate crown–root ratio.

Careful abutment selection is critical for the success of bridgework. The prosthesis must be capable of tolerating occlusal forces, which would normally be received by the missing tooth as well as its normal occlusal loading. These forces are transmitted to the abutment(s) via the prosthesis.

Vital teeth are preferred to endodontically treated ones for bridge abutments. Endodontically treated teeth have lost a large amount of tooth structure, weakening them and making them less able to tolerate additional occlusal loading. Post crowns have been shown in some studies to have a higher failure rate.

For resin bonded bridges abutment teeth should ideally be unrestored and have enough enamel to support the metal wing retainer. Additionally there must be sufficient space to accommodate the minimum connector width of 0.7mm and 2mm connector height. It is acceptable for the abutment to be minimally restored with small composite restorations provided they are sound. It is advised to replace old composite restorations prior to cementation to provide optimum bond strength via the oxide layer.

Teeth with active disease such as caries or periodontal disease should not be used as abutments until the disease has been stabilised. Once stable periodontally compromised teeth may be used as abutments, depending on the crown to root ratio described below.

Ante's law states that the roots of abutment teeth must have a combined periodontal surface area in three dimensions that is more than that of the missing root structures of the teeth replaced with a bridge, is used in bridgework design. This law remains controversial in terms of supporting clinical evidence.

Crown to root ratio is the distance from the occlusal/incisal surface of the tooth to the alveolar crest in relation to the length of root within the bone. The minimum ratio of crown to root is considered to be 1:1, although the most favourable is a crown:root of 2:3. As the proportion of tooth supported by bone decreases, the lever effect increases.

Root configuration should be considered when selecting abutment(s). Divergent roots of posteriors provide increased support compared to converging, fused or conical roots. Roots that curve apically provide increased support compared to those which have a fixed taper.

The number of abutments required depends on both the position of the tooth to be replaced and the length of the span. Cantilever designs utilising one abutment is the design of choice for replacing a single tooth anteriorly and can also be used posteriorly.

Occlusion of the pontic with the opposing tooth should be assessed. This may determine which type of design is most appropriate and therefore how many abutments are required. For resin bonded bridges the pontic should have light contact in intercuspal position (ICP) and no contact in lateral excursions.

=== Biomechanical considerations ===
Torquing forces can occur when the pontic lies outside the interabutment axis line as the pontic acts as a lever arm. This is particularly applicable to long span bridges replacing multiple anteriors.

Deflection varies directly with the cube of the length, and inversely with the cube of the occlusogingival thickness of the pontic. The longer the span, the more deflection occurs. The amount of deflection is 8 times greater when the length of the span increases to 2 pontics, and increases to 27 times greater with 3 pontics in comparison to a single pontic. It is likely that increased span length will result in the abutments being subjected to increased torquing forces. The thinner the pontic, the more deflection occurs. If the thickness of the pontic is reduced by 50% this causes an 8 times increase in deflection. Choosing pontics with increased occlusogingival dimension and using high yield strength alloys to construct the prosthesis will help reduce deflection.

=== Indications for use ===
1. Replacement of a single tooth or a small spanning space.
2. Good oral health status and motivation of patient to maintain oral health.
3. Periodontal status of remaining dentition at a stable and satisfactory level.
4. Abutment teeth of good quality with minimal restorations and enough surface area and enamel present for adhesion.
5. Splinting of periodontally compromised teeth to improve occlusal stability, comfort and decrease mobility. (Periodontally compromised teeth is also a contraindication).
6. As a way of fixed retention after orthodontic treatment or extraction.
7. Patient unsuitable for implants. This may be due to inadequate bone levels, expense or patient not wanting to receive implants.

=== Contraindications ===
1. Size of saddle area too long.
2. Patients with parafunction e.g. bruxism.
3. Tooth mobility increases risk of de-bonding.
4. Malaligned teeth resulting in poor aesthetics and common path of insertion.
5. Abutment tooth quality inadequate for example may have a reduced surface area, reduced enamel or be heavily restored.
6. Increased risk of caries due to increased difficulty in maintaining oral hygiene around the bridgework.
7. Increased risk of loss of vitality.
8. Allergy to base metal alloys e.g. nickel
9. Poor patient motivation. Active dental disease (caries, periodontal disease) and poor oral hygiene.

== Types of artificial plastic teeth ==
Types of artificial plastic teeth (known in the industry as Pontics)

1. Wash-through Pontic (also known as hygienic pontic or sanitary pontic)
2. Dome Pontic (also known as bullet- or torpedo-shaped)
3. Ridge Lap Pontic (also known as Full Saddle Pontic)
4. Modified Ridge-Lap Pontic
5. Ovate Pontic
6. Conical Pontic

A pontic aims to restore aesthetics, give occlusal stability and improve function.

The hygienic pontic does not contact the underlying alveolar ridge, making it the most straightforward to keep clean. Due to the poor aesthetics of this design it is most commonly employed to replace mandibular molars.

The bullet pontic is the second most favourable in terms of being able to maintain good oral hygiene, with the pontic only contacting one point of the alveolar ridge.

Ridge lap and modified ridge lap pontics have superior aesthetics to the designs discussed previously, with the labial/buccal surface aiming to restore the appearance of a natural tooth from the incisal edge to the gingival margin. To minimise coverage of the soft tissues the lingual/palatal portion of the pontic is reduced to improve accessibility for maintaining good oral hygiene. For the modified ridge lap design the pontic only contacts the buccal aspect of the alveolar ridge.

The ovate pontic comes into contact with the underlying soft tissue and hides the defects of the edentulous ridge with applying light pressure. It is commonly used in provisional bridges following extraction of teeth to improve the emergence profile and helps in shaping the gingiva around the future fixed prosthesis.

== Types of bridges according to durability ==
Bridges can either be provisional (temporary/interim) or permanent. The provisional bridge is a transitional restoration that protects the teeth that are weakened by the preparation, and stabilises the dental tissues until the fabrication of the final restoration, moreover, it can pave the way to the aesthetics of the future permanent restoration and its appearance, which can help the patient accept the final profile. Provisional restorations are designed to be used for a few weeks to months, they can be fabricated directly (by chair side), or indirectly ( in the dental laboratory). It is usually tried in a few times to check if it fits properly and if its margins are well adapting on the teeth surface and gingiva, it may need relining or a few adjustments. Provisional bridges can either be made of acrylic resins or metal. The resins are the most commonly used, they are either made of cellulose acetate, polycarbonate or poly-methyl methacrylate. Other chemically activated resins include poly-R methacrylates: these are methacrylates with ethyl or isobutyl substances added to increase the strength of material. Also, commonly used resins include the BisGMA based dimethacrylate, and the visible light urethane di-methylacrylate. Dimethacrylate-based materials were found to be better than monomethacrylates for temporary restorations in terms of flexural strength and hardness.

== Types of bridges according to material ==
1. Metal based, noble based metals such as gold, or base metal alloys such as nickel chromium.
2. Non-metal based. They can be either resin veneered, fibre-reinforced composite, porcelain fused to metal, or ceramics which are either silica, alumina, or zirconia.

=== Acrylic resin and porcelain fused to metal (PFM) ===
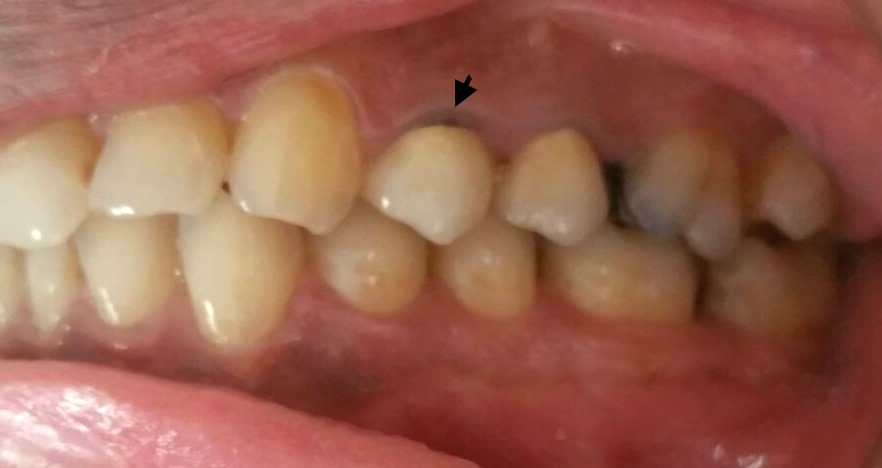
Unaesthetic display of metal in a porcelain fused to metal restoration

Acrylic resin was the first veneering material used to help restore the aesthetics of crown and bridges. The aim was to maintain a similar colour to natural teeth by attaching it on the labial surface of metal crown / bridges; however, resin-veneered dental prosthetics lacked stability and abrasion resistance. Porcelain fused to metal (PFM) was then introduced; the porcelain is composed of two layers (one opaque to cover the metal substructure and another translucent to provide an enamel illusion). Still several researchers consider PFM the gold standard as it has been reported to have 95% success over a 10-year period, a reason why newer types of all-ceramic restorations are usually compared to PFM crowns/bridges to assess its success and durability. However, PFM restorations may show a grey colour at the cervical margins of the tooth showing the metal substructure.

=== IPs Emax ===
IPs Emax ceramics offer high aesthetic properties, which is why its use has been increasingly popular. However, there is insufficient evidence to determine the longevity of Emax in bridges; some reports have found fair short-term survival, but unfavorable medium-term survival. Failures of restorations were most reported in the posterior teeth region. IPs Emax is available as press ingots or as IPs Emax CAD/CAM system. Emax use in crowns or bridges is not recommended for patients who suffer from bruxism.

=== Zirconia ===
Zirconia is used in anterior, and posterior fixed bridges, and also on implants. Zirconia is fabricated using the dental CAD/CAM technology. It has high mechanical strength and it can withstand high occlusal forces compared to all-ceramic materials. in addition it can resist crack propagation in the core material; however, cracks often occur in the veneering material leading to its fracture whether in the tooth-supported or implant-supported bridges. Reports found that the 3×3 mm designed connectors in zirconia bridges increased the strength to resist fracture by 20%.

Although the use of ceramic based fixed prosthesis have been popular as it achieves a lifelike, highly esthetic appearance, a Cochrane Review found insufficient evidence to support or refute the effectiveness of ceramic materials for fixed prosthodontic treatment over metal-ceramic.

== Clinical stages of bridgework ==
1. Assessment: Clinical assessment of the patient's suitability for bridgework. Detailed history (including medical history), appropriate assessment of the suitability of the patient's oral environment (including occlusion, caries risk, periodontal risk, radiographic examination, sensibility testing), assessment of patient aims and motivation, abutment tooth selection and bridge design.
2. Primary impressions: Primary impressions can be taken with alginate to make study casts. A facebow record should also be taken to enable the occlusion to be studied prior to provision of the prosthesis
3. Diagnostic wax-up: This enables the patient to visualise how the definitive prosthesis will look. The wax up can also be used to construct a putty matrix which can be used subsequently to make a temporary restoration.
4. Restoration replacement: Restorations in abutment teeth with questionable prognosis or old composite resin restorations for adhesive bridgework should be replaced.
5. Tooth preparation: This should be completed with reference to radiographs and study casts obtained during treatment planning. For conventional bridges, tooth preparation should aim to conserve tooth tissue, ensure a parallel path of insertion, achieve clearance in the occlusion and ensure well defined preparation margins. The taper of each preparation on the abutment teeth must be the same. This is known as parallelism among the abutments and allows the bridge to fit onto the abutment teeth. Adhesive bridges require minimal preparation.
6. Master impressions: An accurate impression should be made of the prepared teeth, along with an impression of the opposing arch. The master casts are used to provide accurate information about the occlusion to the laboratory and construct the prosthesis.
7. Occlusal registration: An occlusal registration is needed when providing extensive bridgework to allow the opposing casts to be related accurately. This may not be necessary if only a small number of teeth are to be restored.
8. Temporary restoration: Should be fabricated if possible to maintain the prepared teeth.
9. Try in: Confirm the clinical acceptability before cementing definitively. Assess the prosthesis on the master casts and identify the cause of any problems if present. A period of temporary cementation to assess clinical acceptability prior to definitive placement is sometimes used.
10. Final placement: Once satisfied the prosthesis is clinically acceptable, cement and bond the bridgework definitively.
11. Review: Assess the bridgework and manage any post-operative issues.

== Restoration fabrication ==
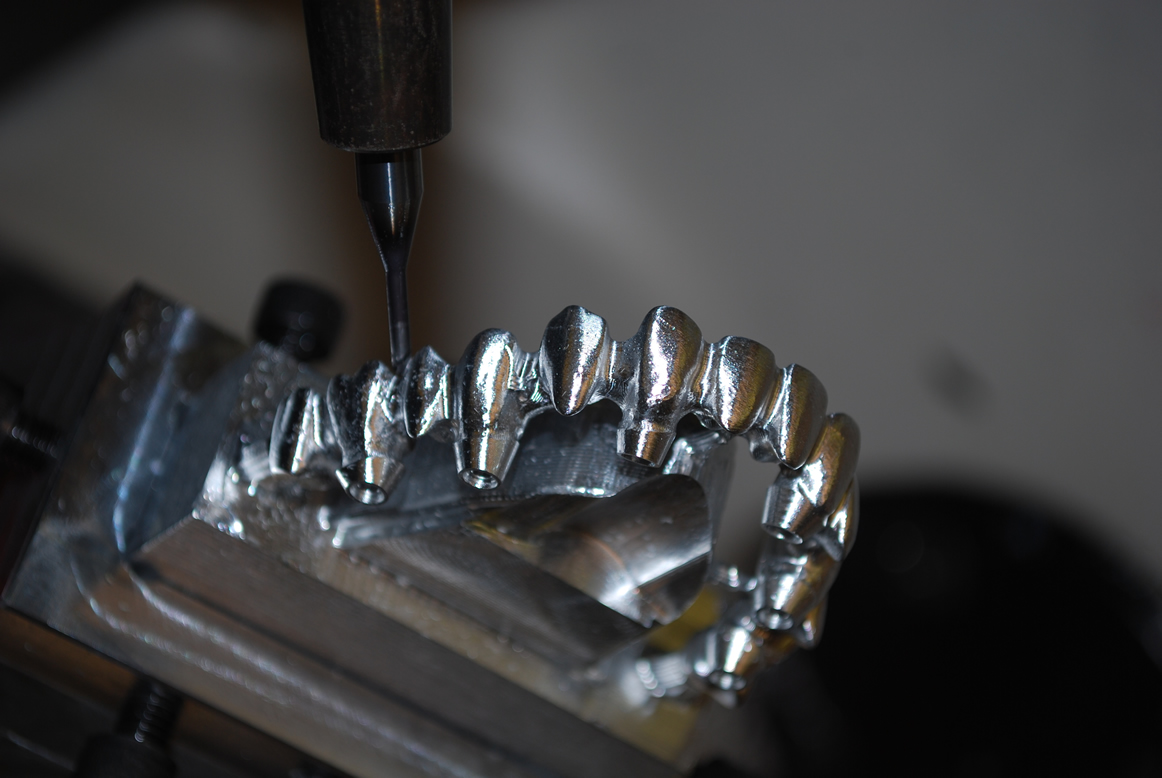
Full dental bridge being machined using WorkNC Dental CAD/CAM software

As with single-unit crowns, bridges may be fabricated using the lost-wax technique if the restoration is to be either a multiple-unit FGC or PFM. Another fabrication technique is to use CAD/CAM software to machine the bridge. As mentioned above, there are special considerations when preparing for a multiple-unit restoration in that the relationship between the two or more abutments must be maintained in the restoration. That is, there must be proper parallelism for the bridge to seat properly on the margins.

Sometimes, the bridge does not seat, but the dentist is unsure whether it is because the spatial relationship between the abutments is incorrect, or whether the abutments do not actually fit the preparations. The only way to determine this is to section the bridge and try in each abutment by itself. If they each fit individually, the spatial relationship was incorrect, and the abutment that was sectioned from the pontic must now be reattached to the pontic according to the newly confirmed spatial relationship. This is accomplished with a solder index.

The proximal surfaces of the sectioned units (that is, the adjacent surfaces of the metal at the cut) are roughened and the relationship is preserved with a material that will hold on to both sides, such as PATTERN RESIN from the company GC America. With the two bridge abutments individually seated on their prepared abutment teeth, the resin is applied to the location of the sectioning to reestablish a proper spatial relationship between the two pieces. This can then be sent to the lab where the two pieces will be soldered and returned for another try-in or final cementation.

== Advantages of bridges ==
Dental bridges offer several advantages.

They can usually be completed in only two dental appointments, restore the tooth back to full chewing function, require no periodic removal for cleaning, have a long life-expectancy and are aesthetically pleasing.

== Bridge failures ==
=== Common reasons for bridge failures ===
1. Poor oral hygiene: As with any fixed prosthesis including bridges, maintaining good oral hygiene to prevent plaque formation around the bridge is key. This will ensure prolonged performance. A study examined the gingival health around the fixed bridges after 14 days – 6 months post insertion found the surfaces were more plaque retentive, causing gingival inflammation regardless the material of fabrication of the bridge, unlike single crowns which did not show the same effect.
2. Mechanical failures: These failures can occur due to loss of retention of the bridge due to improper cementation, construction or preparation.

Fracture of the metal coating or pontic can also lead to mechanical failures. Fracture in connectors of bridges at the gingival side is a common finding in most all-ceram bridges.

1. Biological failures: These can occur due to caries in the tooth (one of the commonest causes of crown and bridge failures) or due to pulpal injury. Problems with abutment teeth such as tooth fracture, secondary caries or periodontal disease can cause discomfort and put pressure on surrounding soft tissues to also cause a biological failure of the bridge.
2. Aesthetic failures: These can occur at the time of cementation and include; colour mismatch, roughness of margins or improper tooth contour.

Aesthetics failures can also occur over a period of time including through wear of teeth, gingival recession or drifting of teeth.

1. Problems with abutment teeth: Abutment teeth affected by secondary caries, vitality loss or periodontal disease can all lead to bridge failure.

=== Oral manifestations of bridge failures ===
Bridge failures result in clinical complications and patients can present with:

1. Pain in the oral cavity
2. Sensitivity, bleeding and inflammation of the gums
3. Foul breath and taste disturbances

=== Bridge failure management ===
Management of bridge failures depends upon the extent and type of failure and these can be prevented through forming a thorough treatment plan with the patient as well regularly emphasising the importance of maintaining a very good level of oral hygiene after the bridge has been placed. The importance of cleaning underneath the pontic, through the use of interdental cleaning aids, should also be reinforced as plaque control around fixed restorations is more difficult.

Management options include:

1. Keeping the bridge under observation/review
2. Repairing, replacing or removing the fault

== See also ==
- Dental implant
- Dental restoration
- Fixed prosthodontics
- Resin retained bridge
