= Mu'a =

Muʻa may refer to:

- Mu'a (Tongatapu), the ancient capital of Tonga
- Mu'a, a village on Niuafoʻou, Tonga
- Mu'a, a village on ʻEua, Tonga, founded by people from Niuafoʻou
- Mua District, of Wallis and Futuna

== See also ==
- Mua (disambiguation)
