= To Be Hero X =

Chinese-Japanese animated series

- Promotional poster
- Genre: Superhero
- Created by: Li Haoling
- Anime television series
- Directed by: Li Haoling
- Written by: Li Haoling
- Music by: Hiroyuki Sawano; Kohta Yamamoto; Hidefumi Kenmochi; Daiki; Shuhei Mutsuki; Hideyuki Fukasawa; Misaki Umase; Ryuichi Takada
- Studio: BeDream (Note: With PB Animation Company, Studio LAN, Paper Plane Animation Studio and others.)
- Licensed by: Crunchyroll (streaming)
- Original network: FNS (Fuji TV) (Japan) bilibili (China)
- Original run: April 6, 2025 – September 13, 2025
- Episodes: 24

To Be Hero X (Chinese: 凸变英雄X; pinyin: Tū Biàn Yīngxióng X) is a Chinese donghua television series co-produced with Aniplex, and the third installment in the To Be Hero anthology franchise. It premiered on Fuji Television and other channels on April 6, 2025. A co-production between BeDream, Bilibili, and Aniplex, the series was made at production company and studio BeDream in collaboration with three animation studios: PB Animation Company, Studio LAN, and Paper Plane Animation Studio. It is directed by Li Haoling, with music by Hiroyuki Sawano, Kohta Yamamoto, Hidefumi Kenmochi, Daiki, Shuhei Mutsuki, Hideyuki Fukasawa, Misaki Umase and Ryuichi Takada.

== Synopsis ==
The story of To Be Hero X is set in a world where "faith" turns people into superheroes, e.g. if people believe that someone can fly, then that person gains the ability to fly. Conversely, heroes lose their powers if people stop believing in them. The trust that people place in heroes is measured and collected as data, and the heroes are ranked according to the public's faith in them. Every two years, the top heroes gather to compete in a tournament and their trust rankings are adjusted accordingly. The number one hero at the top of the rankings is known as "X".

== Characters ==
=== Protagonists ===
Lin Ling (林凌; Lín Líng) / The Commoner (普通人; Pǔtōng rén)
Voiced by: Gu Jiangshan (Chinese); Natsuki Hanae (Japanese); Mauricio Ortiz-Segura (English)
The 10th-ranked hero and the central character of episodes 1~4. He is an ordinary civilian who is forced to assume the identity of the hero Nice after the latter seemingly committed suicide. Gaining Nice's powers through the faith of the hero's fans, he pulls off the act for a while but ultimately concludes that he is not Nice and develops his own hero identity.
As Nice, he had multiple superpowers, including: flight, super strength, and increased endurance. As his own hero persona, he has shown enhanced strength.
E-Soul (魂电; Hún diàn) / Yang Cheng (杨澄; Yang Cheng)
Voiced by: Yang Kaiqi (Chinese); Nobunaga Shimazaki (Japanese); Stephen Fu / Paige Guillory (young) (English)
The 9th-ranked hero and the central character of episodes 5~7. He unwittingly became the successor of the original E-Soul, a legendary hero who once saved the entire world, after rescuing a child while dressed as the latter, causing the public to transfer their faith to him. Unfortunately, this culminates in him becoming fully absorbed into his E-Soul persona, abandoning his civilian identity in the process.
He has electrokinesis, allowing him to produce and control electricity, manipulate machines with his mind, and move at super speed.
Ahu (阿虎; Ā Hǔ)
Voiced by: Zhang Fuzheng (Chinese); Koichi Yamadera (Japanese); Christopher Sabat (English)
The 8th-ranked hero and the central character of episode 23. He is a Shar Pei who gained self-awareness and speech from the public's faith and wishes to be a hero for the sake of his young owner.
He has shapeshifting abilities.
Lucky Cyan (幸运青; Xìngyùn Qīng) / Cyan (青; Qīng)
Voiced by: Zhao Shuang (Chinese); Inori Minase (Japanese); Jill Harris (English)
The 7th-ranked hero and the central character of episodes 8~10. She grew up at an orphanage that exploited her power—supernatural luck—until she finally had enough and ran away. Afterward, she became a street performer and eventually grew into a popular singer.
She fights using music empowered by people's faith, and her songs are said to bring good fortune to those who hear them.
Loli (罗莉; Luó Lì) / Luo Li (罗莉; Luó Lì)
Voiced by: Qian Chen (Chinese); Ayane Sakura (Japanese); Sarah Wiedenheft (English)
The 6th-ranked hero and the central character of episodes 13~14. She is a genius engineer who has wanted to be a hero since childhood, but struggles to gather public faith due to her cute appearance not fitting the stereotype, prompting her to instead rely on gadgets of her own design.
She fights using a mechanical suit that she built herself.
Little Johnny (小强; Xiǎo qiáng) / Ah Johnny (阿强; Ā qiáng) & Big Johnny (大强; Dà qiáng)
Voiced by: Chen Jinwen (Little Johnny) (Chinese); Yoshitsugu Matsuoka (Little Johnny) (Japanese); Caleb Yen / Lara Woodhull (young) (Little Johnny), Lindsay Seidel / Kenny James (Big Johnny / Big Johnny (Monster)) (English)
The 5th-ranked heroes and the central characters of episodes 17~19; known collectively as "The Johnnies". Little Johnny is the son of a previous first-ranked hero who was assassinated for unknown reasons, prompting him to become a hero himself to uncover the truth. Meanwhile, Big Johnny is an animal-like alien whom Little Johnny adopted as his pet.
Little Johnny can speak with animals, while Big Johnny is immune to faith-based superpowers and can become a monster, though the latter is prone to losing control in this state.
Ghostblade (默杀; Mò Shā) / Wang Yi (王毅; Wáng Yì)
Voiced by: Chang Wentao (Chinese); Yuichi Nakamura (Japanese); Ernesto Jason Liebrecht (English)
The 4th-ranked hero and the central character of episodes 15~16. He works as a "cleaner" who silences rogue heroes. Despite having antisocial tendencies, the public views his silent demeanor as "cool," causing their faith to turn him mute. In truth, he is just a socially awkward man who desperately wishes to reconcile with his estranged family.
He is a highly skilled assassin who fights with blades.
Dragon Boy (梁龙; Liáng Lóng)
Voiced by: Chenzhang Taikang (Chinese); Koki Uchiyama (Japanese); Ricco Fajardo (English)
The 3rd-ranked hero and the central character of episodes 21~22. He is a delinquent who hates the current world and seeks to destroy it by monopolizing public faith and becoming a god-like being akin to his idol—Zero, a legendary hero-turned-villain who once nearly destroyed the world.
He possesses enhanced strength and grows stronger the more injured he becomes.
Queen (女王; Nǚ Wáng) / Liu Yuwei (刘宇唯; Liú yǔ wéi)
Voiced by: Liu Xiaoyu (Chinese); Kana Hanazawa (Japanese); Morgan Lauré (English)
The 2nd-ranked hero and the central character of episodes 11~12. She is a prodigy who strives to become the #1 hero and abolish the current, corrupt hero system, unaware that her own father is the leader of the villainous Spotlight Organization—a terrorist group undermining society by turning civilians into villains empowered by public fear.
She fights using a spear and can create an "area" where she can dictate the laws of the world to a limited extent.
X
Voiced by: Wei Chao (Chinese); Mamoru Miyano (Japanese); David Matranga (English)
The top-ranked hero and the central character of episode 24. Despite being #1, he remains unaffiliated with any agency, and his true identity is a mystery; "X" is not his hero name but an epithet given to the top-ranker. In actuality, he is just an ordinary office worker.
He can control space and manipulate reality, which is primarily displayed in-universe through the animation-style changing.

=== Supporting Characters ===
Nice (奈斯; Nài sī)
Voiced by: Gu Jiangshan (Chinese); Natsuki Hanae (Japanese); Branden Loera (English)
The 15th-ranked hero and a supporting character in multiple episodes. Publicly viewed as the "perfect hero," this perception resulted in him developing obsessive–compulsive disorder through his followers' faith, causing him to gradually become depressed with being a hero. This culminates in him seemingly committing suicide in episode 1, after which Lin Ling is forced to assume his identity.
He has multiple superpowers, including flight, super strength, and increased endurance.

Moon (潇月卿; Xiāo yuè qīng)

Voiced by: Chang Rongshan (Chinese); Aki Toyosaki (Japanese); Bryn Apprill (English)

== Media ==
=== Music ===
The opening theme song for the series titled "INERTIA", is performed by SawanoHiroyuki[nZk]:Rei with and lyrics by Benjamin, while the ending theme song, titled "KONTINUUM", is performed by SennaRin with lyrics also by Benjamin. Benjamin and mpi performed the series' main theme titled "JEOPARDY", while SawanoHiroyuki[nZk]:Rei & SennaRin performed the X version of "INERTIA" for the final episode.

==== Character and insert songs ====
In addition to the opening and ending themes, To Be Hero X features a variety of character songs, many of which appear as insert tracks during episodes or were released shortly before a character's arc aired.

Character	Song title	Performer(s)	Writer(s)	Composer(s)/Arranger(s)	Episode(s)	Notes
X	"New Type of Hero"	Chatterbox	Griff Clawson	Griff Clawson	24	Promotional character theme, Insert song
Nice / Lin Ling	"PARAGON"	Benjamin & mpi	Benjamin	Hiroyuki Sawano	1, 4	Insert song
E-Soul	"NEON RAIN"	Eliana	Benjamin	Kenmochi Hidefumi	5, 7	Insert song
Ahu	"SPARX"	Robert Taira Wilson	Benjamin	Kohta Yamamoto	23	Insert song
Lucky Cyan	"Take Off"	Lucky Cyan	Shown	DAIKI (AWSM.)	8, 9, 10, 16	Insert song
Lucky Cyan, Luo	"My Color"	Lucky Cyan, Luo	Shown	DAIKI (AWSM.)	7, 9, 10, 11, 16	Insert song
The Johnnies	"growL"	J.Rio	cAnON.	Misaki Umase	17, 18	Insert song
Loli	"Candy Mountain"	Kokudo Kaon	nikiie	Shuhei Mutsuki	13, 15	Insert song
Ghostblade	"Because of you"	Kris Roche	Hideyuki Fukasawa, Kris Roche	Hideyuki Fukasawa	16	Insert song
Dragon Boy	"Scar"	AK LIUZHANG (Liu Zhang)	DAIKI (AWSM.)	DAIKI (AWSM.)	21	Insert song
Queen	"Queen of the stars"	R!N	R!N	Ryuichi Takada (MONACA)	11	Insert song

=== Popularity poll ===
There is a popularity poll featuring each arc's focus character on Bilibili, which registered users can vote in; the number of votes each character receives will supposedly influence their performance during the second season.

=== Episodes ===
==== Chronology ====
The first season of To Be Hero X is structured into eleven narrative arcs that are told out of chronological order. These arcs are chain-linked, with the focus character of the next arc appearing in the preceding one.

The chronological order of the episodes in To Be Hero X's first season is roughly: Episodes 17~18 (first half) > Episodes 8~9 > Episode 11 > Episodes 5~7 > Episode 10 > Episodes 12~16 > Episode 18 (second half) > Episodes 19~23 > Episodes 1~4 > Episode 24.

==== Episode list ====
No. in season	Title	Directed by	Written by	Original release date
Nice / Lin Ling
1	"Nice"; Transliteration: "Nài sī" (Chinese: 奈斯)	Li Haoling	Li Haoling	April 6, 2025
After being fired from his job at an ad agency for making a commercial claiming "anyone" can be a hero, Lin Ling is about to jump off a building when the fifteenth-ranked hero—Nice—suddenly walks past him and commits suicide himself. Nice’s manager—Miss J—then appears and kidnaps Ling to prevent news from spreading. Realizing Ling resembles Nice, Miss J forces him to impersonate the hero while covering up his death by releasing an article claiming Ling was the one who died. Ling pulls off the act, granting him Nice's powers from the Trust Value of the hero's fans, and he soon goes on a talk show run by the hero Enlighter with Nice's girlfriend—the hero Moon. Enlighter attempts to slander "Nice" by bringing out Ling’s old boss, who became a villain empowered by fear, and blaming him for "Ling's" supposed suicide. However, the boss instead goes on a rampage, demanding payment for his services to Nice's hero agency—the TREEMAN Corporation. Though initially scared, Ling perseveres and defeats his former boss. Afterward, Ling goes to sleep in Nice’s house when he finds Moon lying on the ground, seemingly dead.
2	"Moon"; Transliteration: "Xiāo yuè qīng" (Chinese: 潇月卿)	Li Haoling	Li Haoling	April 13, 2025
Waking up to find Moon is okay, Ling concludes that her death was a bad dream. However, Moon deduces that Ling is an impostor and reveals that her relationship with Nice is a fabrication. While Moon wants out of her contract, Miss J announces that they plan for the two to get married and locks them inside Nice’s apartment until they agree. However, after bonding with Moon, Ling proposes an alternate plan to Miss J: faking Moon's death. They stage a fake proposal and plan to have it attacked by Wreck, Nice’s best friend and fabricated nemesis. Unfortunately, Wreck sees through Ling's impersonation and goes on a rampage upon learning of Nice's suicide, forcing Ling to defeat him for real and resulting in Wreck falling to his death. Ling and Moon then successfully fake the latter's death by pretending she was hit during the battle. Afterward, Ling says goodbye to Moon as she uses her powers to teleport herself away. Elsewhere, Enlighter deduces Ling is impersonating Nice when he is approached by a group of villains known as the Spotlight Organization, who offer him the power of Fear, which he accepts, becoming the villain God Eye.
3	"The Ever-Standing Hero"; Transliteration: "Bù dǎo yīngxióng" (Chinese: 不倒英雄)	Li Haoling	Li Haoling	April 20, 2025
To break into the top ten heroes, Miss J tasks Ling with apprehending Wolf Girl, the nemesis of the current tenth-ranked hero—Firm-Man. Discovering Wolf Girl's hideout, Ling uncovers that she plots to bomb a statue of Firm-Man. The bombs explode, causing the statue to almost fall on a child until Firm-Man stops it. However, Wolf Girl captures and threatens the child unless Firm-Man lets the statue fall. Fortunately, Ling arrives and tells Firm-Man what he learned at the hideout: Wolf Girl is the first person Firm-Man ever saved, and that she wants him to lose his power—unbendability—so he can stop suffering from its side effects. This revelation brings Firm-Man to tears, plummeting his Trust Value and removing his powers. The statue begins to fall, but Ling stops it, causing his own Trust Value to skyrocket, making him the new number ten. Afterward, Ling meets with the now-retired Firm-Man and confesses that he is not Nice, but the latter does not care and tells him to just "be himself". However, God Eye then publicly broadcasts that he has kidnapped Moon and threatens to expose Ling.
4	"The Commoner"; Transliteration: "Lín líng" (Chinese: 林凌)	Li Haoling	Li Haoling	April 27, 2025
Ling wants to save Moon but is stopped by Miss J and the public's will. Instead, Miss J’s boss—TREEMAN CEO Shand—sends the hero Blankster, whose punches erase memories, to cover up the situation. However, God Eye defeats Blankster after plummeting his Trust Value by exposing his past as a cheating boxer. Miss J’s goons interrupt God Eye's broadcast with the same commercial Ling made the day he was fired. This inspires Ling to go against the will of the people, which undoes his powers. Arriving at the scene, Ling publicly comes clean about Nice's suicide and tries to fight God Eye, but gets repeatedly beaten. However, Ling’s determination and confession of love to Moon inspire the audience, giving him his own Trust and power of super strength, allowing him to defeat God Eye, though the captive Moon is revealed to be a fake. Afterward, God Eye is arrested, and Ling develops his own hero persona—The Commoner. Later, Ling visits the real Moon, only for her to then be assassinated by the ninth-ranked hero—E-Soul.
E-Soul
5	"One Actor"; Transliteration: "Yīgè yǎnyuán" (Chinese: 一个演员)	Li Haoling	Li Haoling	May 4, 2025
Yang Cheng is an orphan working as an E-Soul actor at a children's theater under the employ of ice-ko shop owner Rock. He gets hired by his school crush—Xia Qing—who cannot tell it is him under his costume, to be a personal entertainer for her younger brother—Pomelo. Cheng and Pomelo bond as the latter helps him prepare for a competition to be a part of E-Soul's hero anniversary presentation. However, his zero Trust Value results in him losing. Still too afraid to confess his feelings towards Qing and sad over his loss, he leaves. Pomelo finds him but gets kidnapped by two of Cheng's former co-workers. Cheng gives chase and causes the kidnapper's vehicle to crash. Though no match against the kidnappers, Cheng refuses to give up, and Pomelo places faith in him upon seeing his determination. This gives Cheng his first trust value, unlocking electric power similar to E-Soul's, allowing him to defeat the kidnappers. Afterward, Cheng brings Pomelo home to Qing when he is confronted by one of the competition's judges—Shang Chao. Note: This story occurs before Nice / Lin Ling's in the timeline.
6	"Two E-Souls"; Transliteration: "Liǎng gè hún diàn" (Chinese: 两个魂电)	Li Haoling	Li Haoling	May 11, 2025
Chao reveals that a recording of Cheng saving Pomelo has gone viral, causing his Trust Value to skyrocket, with the public branding him the "New E-Soul." Cheng gets convinced by Rock and Chao to become a hero, with the latter offering to be his manager and even building a small HQ for him at a warehouse. However, as Cheng begins working as a hero and his Trust Value continues to increase, his popularity starts to eclipse that of the real E-Soul. This prompts E-Soul's manager to attempt to frame Cheng for being behind Pomelo's kidnapping to increase his Trust Value, causing him to get arrested. Fortunately, Chao hires Enlighter to gather evidence of Cheng's innocence, and he is cleared of all charges. The next day, Cheng and Qing go to meet with Chao at the HQ, only for one of the same assailants who tried to kidnap Pomelo to kill Chao as Cheng and Qing watch on in horror.
7	"Three Seats"; Transliteration: "Sān gè xíwèi" (Chinese: 三个席位)	Li Haoling	Li Haoling	May 18, 2025
Cheng blames himself for Chao's death, believing he could have stopped the assassin but hesitated. Learning from Enlighter that the culprits have a powerful benefactor, Cheng assumes that it is the real E-Soul trying to sabotage him again and publicly challenges him to a duel; E-Soul is convinced to accept by his manager. Qing repeatedly tries to talk Cheng out of fighting, but he refuses, causing the two to fall out. During the duel, Cheng uses a strategy devised by Rock to get around E-Soul's electromagnetic shielding: forcing him to use his signature move—Lightning Slash—by starting an online campaign against him. With E-Soul's Trust Value plummeting, he is convinced by his manager to use Lightning Slash, but Cheng counters, killing the hero in the process. Afterward, Cheng—now the sole "E-Soul"—absorbs his predecessor's Trust Value and becomes the 9th-ranked hero, unaware that Rock—actually the CEO of hero agency Mighty Glory—is the true mastermind behind Pomelo's kidnapping and Chao's assassination; all to prop Cheng up.
Lucky Cyan
8	"The Cyan Girl"; Transliteration: "Qīngsè de nǚhái" (Chinese: 青色的女孩)	Li Haoling	Li Haoling	May 25, 2025
A young girl miraculously survives a plane crash and is found by journalist Liu Zhen. Suspicious that no hero intervened in the incident, Zhen writes a scathing article about it, but his publisher refuses to release it, prompting him to quit. He also secretly smuggles the girl to safety and leaves her with a friend, who is the dean of an orphanage, naming her Cyan. Cyan is soon revealed to be incredibly lucky, which the other orphans, the caretakers, and eventually even the dean begin to exploit. As a result, five years later, the orphanage has become a cult centered around her. However, this leaves Cyan isolated from her peers until she meets a new boy named Luo, who is said to bring misfortune. Confiding in him about her desire to be "average", he helps her feel normal, and the two bond. Another six years later, the now-teenage Cyan and Luo attempt to escape from the orphanage but are intercepted by the dean, who reveals himself to be a former hero with intentions of raising the orphans into heroes as well. Note: This story occurs before E-Soul and Nice / Lin Ling's in the timeline.
9	"Loss and Gain"; Transliteration: "Sǔnshī yú shōuhuò" (Chinese: 损失与收获)	Li Haoling	Li Haoling	June 1, 2025
Despite the dean's attempts to stop her, Cyan escapes when a combination of her luck and Luo's misfortune causes a truck to crash into the orphanage. However, Luo sacrifices himself to ensure Cyan's escape and is left behind. With her Trust Value and luck gone due to her rejecting her identity as a cult figure, Cyan becomes a street performer to earn money and afford necessities, finally giving her a normal life. She soon becomes popular, causing her powers to return, and is scouted by hero agency DOS, becoming a hero in exchange for their help in saving Luo; however, bitter over losing custody of Cyan, the dean lies that Luo died during the escape while actually keeping the boy confined at the orphanage. Two years later, Cyan is now a famous singer by the name "Lucky Cyan". Luo learns about Cyan's new life and is happy for her until the dean whispers something in his ear, shocking him. Afterward, the orphanage's inhabitants are seen having been transformed into zombie-like creatures.
10	"The Truth behind Luck"; Transliteration: "Xìngyùn de zhēnxiàng" (Chinese: 幸运的真相)	Li Haoling	Li Haoling	June 8, 2025
The zombification of the orphanage's inhabitants is revealed to stem from public fear after their connection to Cyan is exposed; the populace learns about her survival in the plane crash, spreading rumors that her luck comes at others' expense. As the negative press impacts Cyan's Trust Value, her colleague—the hero Queen—comes up with a plan: unveil the truth behind the incident using the plane's black box, which Zhen salvaged and entrusted to the dean. Returning to the orphanage, Cyan takes the recorder after defeating the zombified inhabitants, including the dean. However, she is then attacked by a fear-infected Luo, who reveals his parents died in the crash. Fortunately, Cyan manages to replay the recording, revealing that her luck originates from the passengers praying for her survival, causing Luo to come to his senses, and the two reconcile. Afterward, Cyan becomes the 7th-ranked hero once her name is cleared, unaware that Zhen and DOS's CEO—Mickey—masterminded everything to unveil the existence of the power of Fear to the public. Elsewhere, Shand begins his own Fear experiments.
Queen
11	"Road to the Crown"; Transliteration: "Jiāmiǎn zhī lù" (Chinese: 加冕之路)	Li Haoling	Li Haoling	June 15, 2025
Liu Yuwei is a prodigy who graduates from university at fourteen years old, where she announces that she intends to become the number one hero. Four years later, she has signed up with DOS and is now the youngest hero to ever break into the top ten, with the public naming her "Queen." Concurrently, her colleague and fellow heroine Bowa wins the 16th biennial Heroes Tournament, becoming the second female top-ranked hero in history. However, Queen and Bowa do not get along, since the latter feels overshadowed by the former. Another four years later, Queen participates in the 18th Heroes Tournament. While it was expected to come down to a match between Queen and Bowa, both are easily defeated by a mysterious participant who instantly becomes the new first-ranked hero; with his true identity unknown, people refer to him by the top-ranker's epithet—"X". Afterward, Queen becomes depressed as she is faced with failure for the first time while Bowa succumbs to the power of Fear after learning that Queen is Zhen's daughter. Note: This story occurs concurrently with Lucky Cyan's in the timeline.
12	"Fall of the Star"; Transliteration: "Yûnluò zhī shí" (Chinese: 陨落之时)	Li Haoling	Li Haoling	June 22, 2025
Queen snaps out of her depression upon learning of the controversy around her junior—Cyan—leading to her formulating the plan of recovering the plane's black box. Shortly afterward, Queen begins working harder than ever as a hero. Conversely, Bowa becomes a Fear-empowered villain as she deludes herself that Queen's rise stems solely from Zhen's connections with Mickey. Two years later, on the night before the 19th Heroes Tournament, Bowa ambushes Queen to eliminate her competition, even though she cannot compete due to dropping out of the top ten. In the end, following a fierce battle, Bowa is defeated and taken into custody. Unfortunately, Queen is also injured and falls unconscious for several days, missing the tournament, which X once again wins. Although Queen is devastated, Cyan tells her to stop overworking herself. By next year, Queen has fully recovered, but Mickey forces her to take a vacation with Cyan. However, while on a road trip together, they stumble upon a monster.
Loli
13	"Tough Girl"; Transliteration: "Nǚ hànzǐ" (Chinese: 女汉子)	Li Haoling	Li Haoling	June 29, 2025
After hearing Queen's university graduation speech as a child, Luo Li gained aspirations of becoming a hero. Unfortunately, she struggles with gathering Trust Value due to her cute appearance not fitting people's stereotypical view of heroes. Not giving up, she builds a mechanical suit using spare parts from her scientist father's lab to fight crime while hiding her appearance as the vigilante "Loli." However, when her helmet accidentally comes off and she gets called "cute" by a girl she saved from a stalker, she nearly reaches her breaking point. Fortunately, Loli's father recognizes her genius and arranges for her to work under him at the technology firm Glimmer Lab. There, Loli reunites with the girl she saved—Wang Nuonuo—and bonds with her as they work together to improve the former's suit. However, after they return from a night out, the lab is suddenly attacked by former first-ranked hero-turned-villain DJ Shindig. Note: This story occurs after E-Soul and Lucky Cyan's, concurrently with Queen's, and before Nice / Lin Ling's in the timeline.
14	"Impromptu Counterattack"; Transliteration: "Jíxìng fǎnjí" (Chinese: 即兴反击)	Li Haoling	Li Haoling	July 6, 2025
Shindig's objective is revealed to be a power of Fear container that Glimmer Lab has been experimenting with. However, he is confronted by Nuonuo, who drunkenly mistakes him for her stalker, and Loli in her upgraded suit. A fight ensues, resulting in Loli throwing Shindig into the Fear container, causing the substance to break free and corrupt him. Loli's father then arrives with a response team led by the hero Ghostblade. However, although they contain the Fear, Shindig escapes. Seeing that Loli is unaffected by the Fear, her father deduces that her suit is resistant to it. Later, Loli's father reports to the hero agencies' regulator—the Hero Affairs Commission—where he reveals that the suit's components originate from a crashed UFO and requests permission to investigate the craft, which he is granted. Elsewhere, Shindig flees back to his benefactor—the Spotlight Organization—and is given a new mission.
Ghostblade
15	"Affective Disorder"; Transliteration: "Qínggǎn zhàng'ài zhèng" (Chinese: 情感障碍症)	Li Haoling	Li Haoling	July 13, 2025
Since young, Wang Yi has had antisocial tendencies. Still, his silent demeanor caused others to view him as "cool," resulting in the Trust system rendering him mute. He eventually got scouted to be a hero by Mighty Glory—taking the name "Ghostblade"—with his primary work being assassinating rogue heroes. During one job, he saved a girl—Zhang Lan—who was as antisocial as himself, and they soon got married. However, Lan changed after their daughter—Nuonuo—was born, wanting Ghostblade to quit being a hero and start a family with her. Unfortunately, he was not ready to take that step, causing her to divorce him and take Nuonuo with her. Unable to be with his daughter conventionally, Ghostblade shadowed her throughout her life, himself being the "stalker" Loli saved her from. In the present, after the Glimmer Lab attack, Ghostblade volunteers to be security for Loli's father's excursion to the crashed UFO upon learning that the incident's witnesses, including Nuonuo, will be joining as well. Note: This story acts as a continuation of Loli's arc.
16	"The Cure"; Transliteration: "Liángyào" (Chinese: 良药)	Li Haoling	Li Haoling	July 20, 2025
A research team, including Ghostblade, Nuonuo, Loli, Loli's father, and the hero Little Johnny and his pet Big Johnny, travels to the UFO crash site. Unfortunately, complications arise when Loli deduces that Ghostblade is Nuonuo's "stalker," culminating in everyone bearing their feelings while camping. However, Ghostblade realizes something is wrong and discovers that they have been followed by Shindig, who has been empowered by Fear and is causing everyone to become overly emotional. Ghostblade proceeds to fight and kill Shindig with ease, though this seemingly causes him to get infected by the power of Fear himself. Afterward, Nuonuo finds Ghostblade's journal and deduces from it that he is her father, while Loli realizes that Little Johnny and Big Johnny have disappeared. Elsewhere, Cyan is contacted by Queen regarding their upcoming vacation together.
The Johnnies
17	"Whisper Flower"; Transliteration: "Báiwǎnhuā" (Chinese: 白婉花)	Li Haoling	Li Haoling	July 27, 2025
Many years ago, during a mission to explore the crashed UFO, former first-ranked hero Ah Sheng captured an animal-like alien. Fearing it would otherwise get experimented on, he brought the creature back home with him, resulting in his son—Ah Johnny, A.K.A Little Johnny—taking it as his pet—Big Johnny. After his wife passes away from terminal illness, Sheng retires as a hero and moves to the countryside with Little Johnny and Big Johnny. There, they lived quietly as a family, with the Johnnies training to become heroes like Sheng. However, three years later, they were suddenly visited one day by Sheng's old colleague—the then top-ranker, Vortex—who requested his aid to deal with a rival hero, but he refused. That night, the Johnnies found Sheng dead outside their house, with Little Johnny assuming Vortex to be the culprit. Overwhelmed by anger, Big Johnny then transformed into a giant monster and attacked a nearby village, prompting Vortex to come to the inhabitants ' aid, while Sheng's true killer—Ghostblade—watched on. Note: The first half of this story occurs chronologically first in the timeline, whereas the second half acts as a continuation of Loli and Ghostblade's arcs.
18	"Died-Out Flame"; Transliteration: "Xímiè de huǒyàn" (Chinese: 熄灭的火焰)	Li Haoling	Li Haoling	August 3, 2025
Big Johnny ultimately defeated Vortex, though fortunately, Little Johnny then arrived and calmed him down. In the aftermath, news of Little Johnny "taming" Big Johnny spread, skyrocketing his Trust Value, and they got scouted by the hero agency FOMO. Afterward, Little Johnny vowed to become the top-ranked hero and make Vortex reveal what he knew about his father's death. However, Vortex later died in the same plane crash that orphaned Cyan. In the present, following the Glimmer Lab attack, FOMO's CEO—Zac—assigns the Johnnies to the UFO research team as scouts. Meanwhile, Mickey has a conversation with Zhen, revealing that the Spotlight Organization works for DOS and Zhen is their leader. Mickey also sends Queen to the UFO crash site under the guise of a vacation. Back with the Johnnies, during Shindig's attack, Big Johnny runs away upon sensing something, and Little Johnny follows. This leads them to find the aftermath of Ghostblade's fight with Shindig, with Little Johnny recognizing it as the work of his father's murderer.
19	"Breaking the Balance"; Transliteration: "Dǎpò pínghéng" (Chinese: 打破平衡)	Li Haoling	Li Haoling	August 10, 2025
As the research team recovers from Shindig's attack, Little Johnny becomes suspicious of Ghostblade, but ultimately dismisses it. Continuing their journey, the team reaches the UFO wreckage and begins excavating it when Big Johnny suddenly runs inside, with Little Johnny and Ghostblade giving chase. Unbeknownst to the others, Ghostblade has been given a secret mission by his superior—Rock—to kill Little Johnny and retrieve Big Johnny. However, they are then both attacked by E-Soul, who was sent to kill them by Rock; Rock mistakenly believes that Ghostblade is hiding something, since the hero repeatedly went behind his back to watch over Nuonuo. Elsewhere, Nuonuo explores the UFO with Loli's father and is confronted by Nice, who attacks after revealing that Shand sent him to dispose of the research team, since their discovery of Trust and Fear-suppressing material could lead to the dissolution of the hero industry. However, he is intercepted by Loli.
Ruins Incident
20	"The Ruins Incident"; Transliteration: "Fèixū shìjiàn" (Chinese: 废墟事件)	Li Haoling	Li Haoling	August 17, 2025
Mickey and Shand team up to blame the events at the UFO on Rock, whom the latter is aware orchestrated the murder of his son—Chao. At the UFO, Loli fights Nice while her father and Nuonuo flee. However, they are met by dark-clad men—the results of Shand's Fear experiments—who knock Nuonuo into a coma and kill Loli's father alongside the other research team members; Loli defeats them all before resuming her battle with Nice. Meanwhile, E-Soul defeats Ghostblade and Little Johnny, causing Big Johnny to transform into his berserk form, destroying the UFO in the process. Fortunately, Queen and Cyan arrive, drawn by the commotion, and the former subdues everyone, ending the battle. One year later, the 20th Heroes Tournament got cancelled; X remains the top hero, Queen became the second-ranked hero, Ghostblade rose to fourth place but resigned from Mighty Glory, the Johnnies transferred to DOS and became the fifth-ranked heroes, and Loli signed up with FOMO and became the sixth-ranked hero. Elsewhere, Rock—revealed to be a worshipper of Zero, the original hero who became corrupted by Fear and nearly destroyed the world in the past—continues his own plans alongside the hero Dragon Boy. Note: This story acts as the conclusion to Queen, Loli, Ghostblade, and The Johnnies' arcs.
Dragon Boy
21	"Nurturing God"; Transliteration: "Péiyù shén" (Chinese: 培育神)	Li Haoling	Li Haoling	August 24, 2025
Having been raised by abusive parents, Dragon Boy harbors a strong hatred toward the world and, together with Rock, seeks to destroy it by monopolizing the Trust System and becoming a god-like being, akin to Zero. To get him into the top ten, Rock orders him to take out one of their current members—former first-ranked hero Smile. Meanwhile, Shand orders Nice to do the same, though the latter is uncomfortable with it, since Smile is his childhood idol. Elsewhere, Smile secretly visits his friend—X—and warns him that the Hero Affairs Commission has ordered his death out of fear of his Trust Value getting too high now that he is the longest serving top-ranker following the 20th Heroes Tournament's cancellation. However, X reveals that he was already planning to forfeit said tournament. Afterward, Smile is confronted by Dragon Boy, who goads the former into attacking him by implying that Rock killed his daughter. However, their fight is interrupted when Dragon Boy notices Nice hiding nearby, waiting to take them both out. Note: This story occurs after Lucky Cyan, E-Soul, Queen, Loli, Ghostblade, and the Johnnies' but before Nice / Lin Ling's in the timeline.
22	"The Last Smile"; Transliteration: "Zuìhòu de wéixiào" (Chinese: 最后的微笑)	Li Haoling	Li Haoling	August 31, 2025
Nice was ordered by Shand, who predicted that Rock and Dragon Boy would also target Smile, to inject the victor with a vial of Fear, which would then cause that person to go berserk and allow him to take the glory by defeating them. Noticing his intent, Dragon Boy gives Nice an opening to inject Smile. However, with Smile's encouragement, Nice ultimately does not go through with it and injects Dragon Boy instead. Unfortunately, Dragon Boy uses his power—returning damage twofold—to turn the Fear back on Smile, corrupting him. Smile then goes berserk, attacking both Nice and Dragon Boy. However, through the faith of onlookers in him, Dragon Boy transforms into a more powerful form and defeats Smile. Enraged, Nice fights Dragon Boy until X arrives and instantly defeats the latter, ending the battle. X then checks on Smile, only to find that he has died from his injuries, and Nice breaks down upon seeing his idol still sporting his trademark smile even in death. Meanwhile, Rock, who observed the battle, deduces that X and Smile are connected.
Ahu
23	"Lie"; Transliteration: "Sāhuǎng" (Chinese: 撒谎)	Li Haoling	Li Haoling	September 7, 2025
Ex-circus dog Ahu gets adopted by one of his fans—Xin Ya—who intends to make him a hero to defeat TREEMAN, which is trying to take her community's land. While no one initially has faith in him, including Ahu himself, opinions shift after he scares off TREEMAN's thugs. However, TREEMAN responds by having Nice use his popularity to scam the people into giving up the land's deed. Ahu and Ya sneak into their hideout to steal it back, but are caught by TREEMAN's henchmen—Phobiaclone, the same men who killed the UFO research team. Fortunately, they run into X, who defeats most of them before leaving, only for them to be confronted by Nice, who orders the last clone to kill them. However, inspired by X, Ahu defeats the clone himself using his old circus tricks while Nice has a nervous breakdown and flees after a little Fear spills onto him. Afterward, Ahu takes credit for X's heroics, skyrocketing his Trust Value and elevating him to the eighth-ranked hero under FOMO; he also gains human speech. Meanwhile, a mentally unstable Nice gets berated by Shand over the failure, culminating in his suicide in episode 1. Note: This story occurs after Lucky Cyan, E-Soul, Queen, Loli, Ghostblade, the Johnnies, and Dragon Boy's in the timeline, and directly leads into Nice / Lin Ling's arc.
X
24	"X"	Li Haoling	Li Haoling	September 13, 2025 (China); September 14, 2025 (International)
Upon learning about the execution order on X, Ahu confronts him, having known his identity as a FOMO salaryman from their earlier encounter, and tries to convince him to drop out of tomorrow's 21st Heroes Tournament. However, they are then ambushed by agents and heroes from the Hero Affairs Commission and hero agencies, who learned X's identity through Rock's research on him. After X defeats them all, Ahu inquires about the former's mention of "the truth". Entertaining him, X teleports them to a dimension outside space-time where he explains to Ahu that the top ten heroes are "chess pieces manipulated by fate" by showing him several events through time, though Ahu fails to understand what X means. The next day, X transports them to the tournament's opening ceremony. The other top ten heroes then enter: Lin Ling, Lucky Cyan, Loli, The Johnnies, Ghostblade, Dragon Boy, Queen, and, shockingly, Nice, who is seemingly alive but has strange cracks all over his body; E-Soul fell out of the top ten. As Ahu enters, with his identity already compromised, X publicly reveals himself by taking to the stage in his civilian form. Note: This story occurs chronologically last in the timeline.
