= Moslem Unity Association =

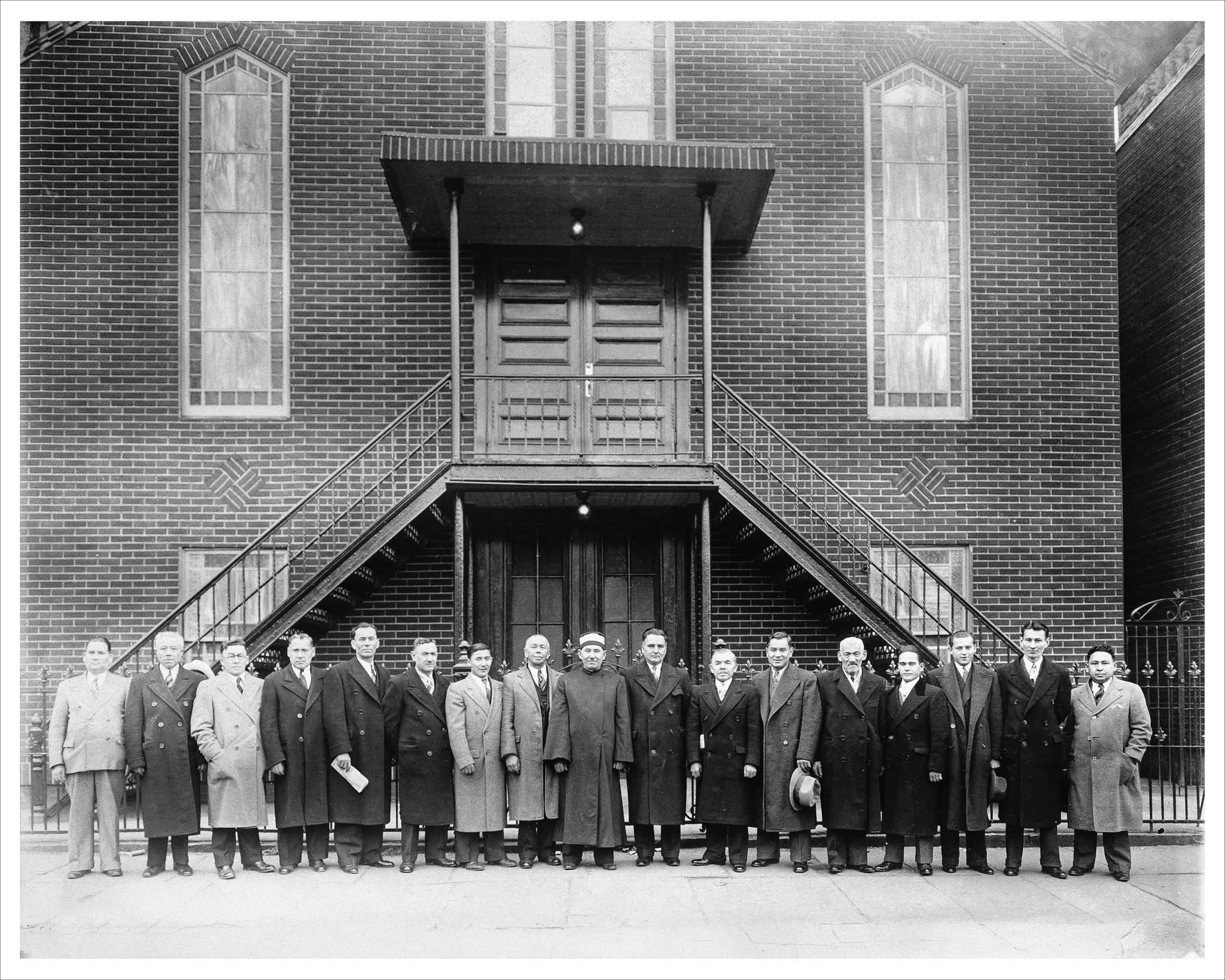
A delegation of New York Muslims at the entrance to the Powers Street Mosque in Brooklyn, New York, 1934

Moslem Unity Association (Tatar: Amerika İslam Cämğiäte / أمريكا يﺱلام جامعئياﻁئ) is a historic religious and cultural organization established in New York City. It was founded on March 15, 1927, by representatives of the first wave of Tatar emigration (primarily from the Volga-Ural region, and later from other regions of the former Russian Empire). It was the first Muslim community in New York City.

The founders included Niyaz Maksudov of Ufa, Abdullah Atlas, Zagidulla Agishev and another individual of the same name from Orenburg, former Imperial Russian Army colonel Rashid Khusainov, Akhtyam Suleimanov, and Ali Wilson, a Tatar from Penza. Although the leadership was predominantly Tatar, the organization also included representatives of other Turkic and Muslim peoples, including Turkmens, Azerbaijanis, Kazakhs, Kyrgyz, Kabardians, Chechens, Adyghe, Karachays, and Crimean Tatars. The organization was initially known as «Muslim Unity» (Tatar: Möselman Berlege / موﺱئلمان بئﺭلئگئ), and in 1963 it was renamed the «Islamic Society of America».

Its stated goals were to defend the rights of Muslim peoples in the United States, preserve cultural traditions, and promote communal solidarity.

In 1960, the «American Turko-Tatar Association» (Tatar: Американ Төрки-Татар Ассоциациясе, Amerikan Törki-Tatar Assotsiatsiyäse, ئامەرىكان تۆركى تاتار ئاسسوتسىئاتسىياسە) was established on the basis of the Islamic Society of America and remains active. By the late 1960s, as other Turkic and Muslim diaspora communities formed independent organizations, the Islamic Society of America ceased operations.

== Bibliography ==
- Валеев Д., Мадьяри А., Ураксин З., Юлдашбаев А. Судьба и наследие башкирских ученных-эмигрантов. Уфа, 1995.
- Гайнетдинов Р. Б. Тюрко-татарская политическая эмиграция: начало XX века — 30-е годы. Исторический очерк. Набережные Челны, 1997.
