= Abutment (dentistry) =

Connecting element in dentistry

In dentistry, an abutment is a connecting element. This is used in the context of a fixed bridge (the "abutment teeth" referring to the teeth supporting the bridge), partial removable dentures (the "abutment teeth" referring to the teeth supporting the partial) and in implants (used to attach a crown, bridge, or removable denture to the dental implant fixture). The implant fixture is the screw-like component that is osseointegrated.

== Bridge abutments ==
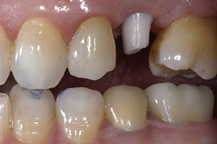
Ceramic abutment connected to implant

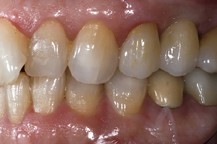
Ceramic crown bonded to abutment

Dental bridge abutments are made such that the path of insertion of the teeth involved is nearly parallel with each other.

== Partial denture abutments ==
Partial denture abutments are unique in that they may incorporate elements such as rest seats, guide planes, and recontouring.

== Implant abutments ==
These are usually called prosthetic implant abutments and are responsible for making the connection between the prosthesis and the implant. These abutments can be made from a variety of materials, such as titanium, surgical stainless steel, gold and zirconia.

The adjacent images show how a ceramic abutment can enhance a ceramic crown by giving it a more lifelike appearance. Ceramic abutments have to be used with care, since their compressive strength is nowhere near that of titanium, gold or other noble metals. Most clinicians feel more comfortable using a metal prosthetic abutment in the posterior molar areas, due to the increased masticatory forces present in these areas.

An abutment is not necessarily parallel to the long axis of the implant. It is utilized when the implant is at a different inclination in relation to the proposed prosthesis. Most crowns and fixed partial dentures have a cemented or screw-retained fixation on the abutment.

== Three-piece implant ==
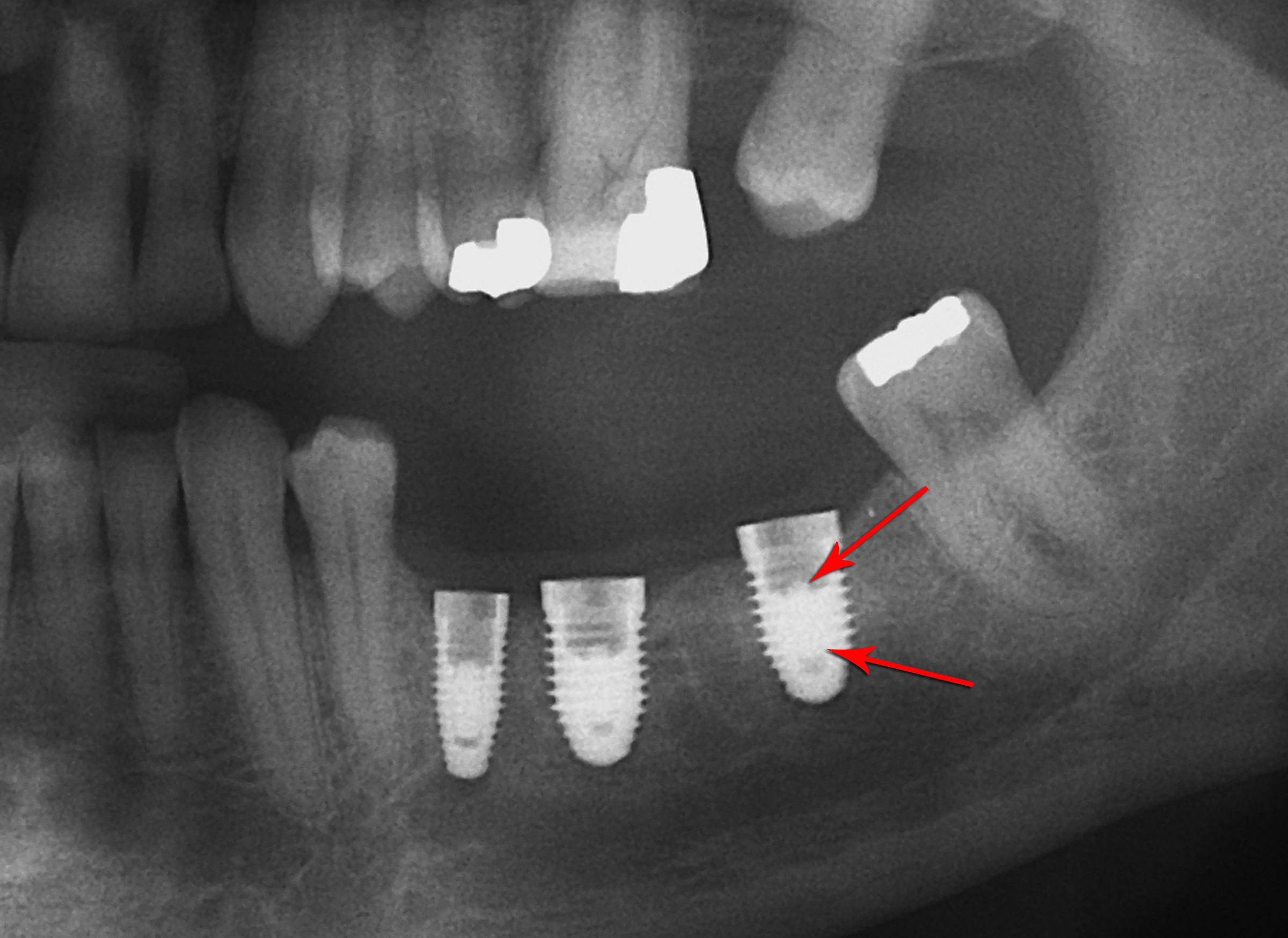
Fracture of abutment screws in three consecutive implants due to severe over-torqueing.

In a three-piece implant the abutment is fixed on the implant with a screw butt joint. This screw needs to be tightened to a predetermined torque with a dental torque wrench, in order to avoid screw loosening during chewing, which can often create a counter-clockwise torque on the implant–abutment interface, encouraging the abutment screw to come loose. This can largely be prevented with proper screw design and torquing of the abutment.

== Two-piece implant ==
In a two-piece implant the abutment is morse tapered or cold welded on the implant. Microbial leakage and colonization between the implant and the abutments can result in inflammatory reactions and crestal bone loss. Morse taper conical abutments showed a cumulative implant survival rate of 98.23% in terms of seal performance, microgap formation, torque maintenance, and abutment stability.

== One-piece implant ==
A one-piece implant incorporates the trans-mucosal abutment as an integral part of the implant. This type of implant is often used with a flapless procedure and immediate loading (the crown is placed a short time after placing the implant).

== Abutment Installation and Fixation ==
An impression is taken from the implant site using conventional impression materials or digital scanning. This impression serves as a template for the fabrication of the abutment and the final prosthesis. Based on the treatment plan, the implantologist selects the appropriate type and design of the abutment, taking into consideration factors such as aesthetics, functional requirements, and the patient's anatomical features. The chosen abutment is carefully installed onto the implant and secured in place. Depending on the abutment system, a fastening screw or a special attachment mechanism may be used to connect to the implant. The abutment screw is tightened, ensuring a reliable and stable connection between the abutment and the implant. To ensure proper alignment and load distribution within the restoration, occlusal adjustment may be performed. Immediately after screwing in the metal components, a healing abutment is embedded. The healing abutments are the primary mounted component, after which the patient transitions to one of the types of abutments. In some cases, after the implant is initially placed, a healing abutment is installed. It helps shape the soft tissues during the healing phase and is later replaced with the final abutment once the desired gum contours are achieved.

== See also ==
- Multi-unit abutment
