= Multi-unit abutment =

Abutment used with dental implants

A multi-unit abutment (MUA) is an abutment most commonly used with dental implants in "All-on-Four" protocols. They are designed for screw-retained group restorations, which are often used in combination with angled dental implants and whole arch replacements, as well as screw fixation of bridges made of zirconium or metal-ceramic group restorations to the implant.

== Medical uses ==
Multi-unit abutments are used to align the prosthesis on a level restorative platform, adjust for variations in implant heights, and place the implant connection at the same level as or just below the gingival surface.

== Terminology ==
Abutment (dentistry)
a supporting element fixed in the implant, a prosthesis is directly attached to the abutment: a crown, multiple restoration or a splinted restoration of a complete dentition.

Multi-unit abutment
A multi-unit abutment is a type of abutment that allows for the connection of multiple implant fixtures to a single prosthesis. They can be angled or straight, and come in various sizes and shapes to fit different implant systems and clinical situations.
