= Rochette bridge =

Dental prosthesis type

A Rochette bridge is a type of dental prosthesis popular in the 1970s, and described by Alain Rochette in 1973 as a form of resin retained bridge that relied on countersunk holes perforating the metal abutment wing. These would be filled with composite cement on seating the restoration, providing micromechanical retention for the prosthesis.

This type of bridge fell out of fashion as modern cements and treatments of the retainer intaglio enabled better retention without the loss of strength inherent in perforation of the retainer wing. Nonetheless, some Rochette bridges remain in service even today.
