= La Rochette =

La Rochette is the name of several communes:

France

- La Rochette, Alpes-de-Haute-Provence
- La Rochette, Ardèche
- La Rochette, Charente
- La Rochette, Hautes-Alpes
- La Rochette, Savoie
- La Rochette, Seine-et-Marne

Luxembourg

- Larochette, in the canton of Mersch

== See also ==
France

- La Croix-de-la-Rochette, in the Savoie département
- La Rochette-du-Buis, in the Drôme département
- Saint-Médard-la-Rochette, in the Creuse département
- Thoré-la-Rochette, in the Loir-et-Cher département
- Vaunaveys-la-Rochette, in the Drôme département
