= Moa Tsukino =

Japanese voice actress (born 1994)

- 月野 もあ
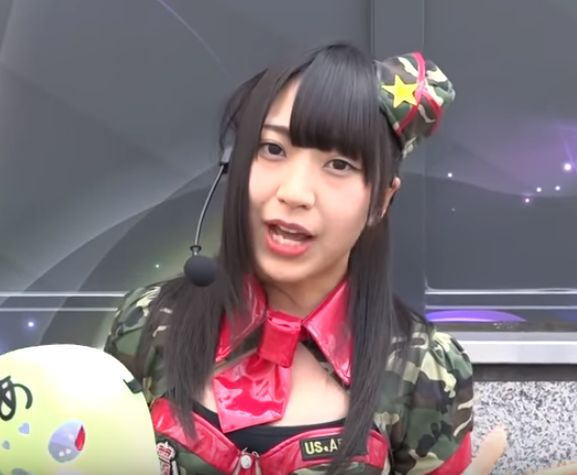
- Born: 7 March 1994 (age 31); Saitama Prefecture
- Other names: Moa-chan
- Occupation: voice actress
- Years active: 2013–
- Style: Idol
- Website: Official profile

Moa Tsukino (月野 もあ, Tsukino Moa; born 7 March 1994, in Saitama Prefecture) is a Japanese voice actress. She is affiliated with Alice Project as a member of the Japanese J-pop idol groups Kamen Joshi.

Her major roles include Min in To Be Hero, Shōta Sayama in Clione no Akari and Futaba Hanaya in To Be Heroine.

== Filmography ==
=== Anime ===
- To Be Hero (2016) – Min
- Clione no Akari (2017) - Shōta Sayama
- To Be Heroine (2018) – Futaba Hanaya
- Chō Futsūken Chiba Densetsu (2024) – Tega-chan
