= Nuevo Mundo Dam =

Dam in Cuba

Neuvo Mundo Dam
- Location within Cuba
- Official name: Presa Neuvo Mundo
- Country: Cuba
- Location: Moa, Holguín Province
- Coordinates: 20°33′28.98″N 74°58′49.55″W
- Purpose: Water supply, power
- Status: Operational
- Opening date: 1985; 41 years ago

Dam and spillways
- Type of dam: Embankment
- Impounds: Moa River
- Height: 75.5 m (248 ft)

Reservoir
- Total capacity: 141,000,000 m^{3} (114,000 acre⋅ft)
- Catchment area: 112 km^{2} (43 mi^{2})

Power Station
- Commission date: 2010
- Turbines: 2 x 1 MW horizontal Francis-type
- Installed capacity: 2 MW
- Annual generation: 16 GWh

The Nuevo Mundo Dam is an embankment dam on the Moa River about 12 km (7.5 mi) south of Moa in Holguín Province, Cuba. The purpose of the dam is municipal water supply and hydroelectric power generation. The 75.5 m (248 ft) tall dam was completed in 1985. The 2 MW power station at the base of the dam was commissioned in 2010.
