= Moa Arimoto =

Japanese actress and model

- Born: May 19, 1986 (age 40); Sapporo, Hokkaido, Japan

Moa Arimoto (有本 もあ Arimoto Moa), (born May 19, 1986), is a Japanese actress and model. She appeared in the movie Kekko Kamen played Wakana Nakai in 2004 and worked with Go Nagai. Currently she lives in Los Angeles, California, working on American movies in both English-language and Japanese-language. In 2008, Moa was cast in the lead role of Izumi Nakamara in the film Sakura.
