= Moa do Katendê =

Romualdo Rosário da Costa
- Born: October 29, 1954; Salvador
- Died: October 8, 2018 (aged 63); Salvador
- Occupations: Musician, capoeira master

Romualdo Rosário da Costa (Salvador, October 29, 1954 — Salvador, October 8, 2018), known as Mestre Môa do Katendê, was a Brazilian composer, musician, craftsman, teacher, and capoeira master.

Regarded one of the greatest Capoeira Angola masters in Bahia, he began practicing capoeira at the age of eight, at his aunt's terreiro.

He was stabbed twelve times in the back after the first round of the 2018 Brazilian general election. According to witnesses and the police investigation, the attack was motivated by political disagreements, after da Costa declared he had voted for left-wing Worker's Party presidential candidate Fernando Haddad. The attacker, a supporter of the opposing candidate and eventual electoral victor Jair Bolsonaro, had argued with the capoeirista and briefly left the scene, returning shortly afterwards with the machete with which he stabbed the victim at least 12 times. (Note: Some reports count 13 stab wounds , while others speak of 12.) da Costa died at the scene. His cousin was stabbed deep in the arm while trying to protect him.

His death prompted tributes from artists such as Caetano Veloso and Gilberto Gil and also international artists, such as Roger Waters. Capoeira groups and movements linked to African culture also paid tribute around the country.

He was laid to rest on October 8, 2022.
