= Kuraray Noritake Dental =

Japanese dental materials manufacturer

Kuraray Noritake Dental Inc.
- Native name: クラレノリタケデンタル株式会社
- Type: Joint venture (Kabushiki gaisha)
- Industry: Dental materials
- Predecessors: Kuraray Medical Inc.; Noritake Dental Supply Co., Ltd.
- Founded: 1 April 2012; 14 years ago
- Headquarters: Tokyo, Japan
- Key people: Satoshi Yamaguchi (president)
- Products: Dental adhesives and composites; Dental ceramics; Dental cements; CAD/CAM materials
- Parent: Kuraray (66.7%); Noritake (33.3%)
- Website: www.kuraraynoritake.com/world/

Kuraray Noritake Dental Inc. is a Japanese manufacturer of dental materials based in Tokyo. It was formed on 1 April 2012 by merging the dental subsidiaries of Kuraray Co., Ltd. and Noritake Co., Limited, which own 66.7% and 33.3% of the company. Its products include dental adhesives, composites, zirconia ceramics and CAD/CAM materials sold under the Clearfil, Panavia and Katana brands.

== History ==
=== Background ===
Kuraray released its first dental product, the Clearfil Bond System F adhesive-and-filling set, in January 1978, and patented the organophosphate monomer 10-methacryloyloxydecyl dihydrogen phosphate (10-MDP) in 1981. The monomer bonds chemically to hydroxyapatite in dental tissues and was first used commercially in the resin cement Panavia EX in 1983. Noritake, originally a porcelain tableware maker founded in 1904, started producing dental plasters in 1939 and entered the dental ceramics market in 1987 with Super Porcelain AAA, a porcelain fused to metal system developed under Kiyoko Ban, co-founder of Noritake's dental business. Noritake Dental Supply Co., Ltd. and Kuraray Medical Inc. were set up as the parents' dental subsidiaries on 1 April 1998 and 21 June 2001 respectively.

=== Merger ===
On 28 January 2011, Kuraray and Noritake announced an agreement to combine their dental businesses, citing Japan's shrinking population and tighter healthcare spending. The deal would bring organic-polymer and inorganic-ceramic technologies under one company and help expand sales abroad. At the time, Kuraray Medical held about 40% of the Japanese market for dental adhesives and fillings, and Noritake Dental Supply held a similar share of the porcelain-fused-to-metal ceramics market with exports to roughly 90 countries. A holding company, Kuraray Noritake Dental Holdings Inc., was set up in April 2011 with the same 66.7%/33.3% ownership split. On 1 April 2012 the two operating subsidiaries and the holding company merged into Kuraray Noritake Dental Inc., which started with 386 employees under first president Sadaaki Matsuyama.

=== Subsequent developments ===
Kiyoyuki Arikawa was the company's president from 2014 to 2020; Satoshi Yamaguchi succeeded him in 2021. The head office moved to the Tokiwabashi Tower in Chiyoda-ku in July 2021. By the company's tenth anniversary in 2022, its products were sold in more than 90 countries.

== Operations and products ==
A second Japanese office is in the Umeda Twin Towers in Kita-ku, Osaka. Manufacturing is carried out at two plants in Japan: the Miyoshi Plant in Miyoshi, Aichi Prefecture, which produces ceramic materials including zirconia and porcelains, and the Niigata Plant in Tainai, Niigata Prefecture, which produces chairside products such as bonding agents, composites and cements. International distribution runs through Kuraray Group affiliates in Germany (Hattersheim am Main), the United States (New York), China (Shanghai) and Brazil (São Paulo).

=== Adhesives, composites and cements ===
The Clearfil line covers adhesives, composite resins and core build-up materials. Composite resins are marketed under the Clearfil Majesty line, which has been used as a test material in clinical trials of single-shade restorative composites. Clearfil SE Bond, a two-step self-etch adhesive containing 10-MDP, is commonly used as the comparison product in studies of self-etch adhesives, including systematic reviews and meta-analyses. A 2019 systematic review found that its micro-tensile bond strength to dentin did not change significantly after 100,000 thermocycles. After Kuraray's 10-MDP patents lapsed, the monomer was adopted by other manufacturers. It now appears in universal adhesives such as 3M Scotchbond Universal, Ivoclar Adhese Universal, Bisco All-Bond Universal, GC G-Premio Bond and Voco Futurabond U. A 2024 review of the 10-MDP literature found that papers mentioning the monomer rose from about three per year before 2005 to nineteen per year afterwards. A 2015 study by Yoshihara and colleagues comparing 10-MDP samples from three different suppliers reported variations in monomer purity, with the Kuraray Noritake sample showing fewer impurities than the two competing sources; the finding has subsequently been cited in reviews of 10-MDP-based adhesive systems.

The Panavia family of dual-cure resin cements, launched as Panavia EX in 1983, was the first commercial product to use 10-MDP. Subsequent generations, including Panavia V5, have appeared in independent comparative studies of dual-cure resin cements. The company also makes Teethmate Desensitizer, a hydroxyapatite-forming desensitising agent, and Clearfil Protect Bond (later marketed as Clearfil SE Protect), which contains the antibacterial monomer 12-methacryloyloxydodecylpyridinium bromide (MDPB). A 2015 systematic review identified Clearfil Protect Bond as the only commercially available dental adhesive at the time to contain an antibacterial monomer.

=== Ceramics and CAD/CAM ===
In 2012 Kuraray Noritake Dental introduced the Katana Zirconia ML disc, a multi-layered zirconia product made with a patented process that produces four colour-gradient layers. Researchers have used the Katana Zirconia STML block, a chairside CAD/CAM material, to compare speed-sintering protocols for yttria-stabilised zirconia. The Cerabien ZR porcelain is used to veneer zirconia frameworks.

=== Patents and litigation ===
Kuraray Noritake Dental holds European Patent No. EP 2024300, covering a method for manufacturing layered ceramics, and licensed it to 3M in March 2018 and to Ivoclar Vivadent AG of Schaan, Liechtenstein, in February 2019.

In August 2019 the company sued an unnamed German competitor at the Düsseldorf District Court for infringing the patent with multi-layered zirconia discs. The defendant tried to have the patent invalidated at the German Federal Patent Court, but the action was dismissed in June 2021. The infringement case was settled in April 2022 with a licence agreement.

== See also ==
- Dental bonding
- Dental composite
- Zirconia in dentistry
