= Clearfil SE Bond =

Clearfil SE Bond is a dental adhesive introduced in 1999 by the Japanese manufacturer Kuraray Medical (since 2012 part of Kuraray Noritake Dental Inc.). It is a two-step, light-cured self-etch system: a primer and a separate bonding resin are applied to the prepared tooth without a prior phosphoric acid etch-and-rinse step. Both components contain the 10-MDP functional monomer, which Kuraray developed in 1981.

== Background ==
Dental adhesives are grouped into "generations" by the number of clinical steps and the etching strategy used. CLEARFIL SE Bond is a sixth-generation, two-step self-etch system: a self-etching primer is applied first, followed by a bonding resin, with no separate phosphoric acid etch or rinse.

10-MDP was synthesised at Kuraray in Kurashiki, Japan, in 1981. Kuraray had earlier used a self-etching primer in CLEARFIL Liner Bond 2 (1993); CLEARFIL SE Bond, released in 1999, applied the same approach in a two-bottle form.

== Composition ==
The adhesive is supplied as two liquids. The primer contains 10-MDP, HEMA, a hydrophilic dimethacrylate and water, and has a pH of about 1.9–2. The bonding resin contains 10-MDP, Bis-GMA, HEMA and a hydrophobic dimethacrylate. Both are cured with a dental curing light.

When applied, the acidic primer demineralises and infiltrates the smear layer and the superficial dentin in a single step, producing a thin hybrid layer (about 0.5–1 μm thick) in which residual hydroxyapatite crystals remain attached to the collagen fibrils. 10-MDP forms ionic bonds with the residual hydroxyapatite, producing MDP–calcium salts that self-assemble into a nano-layered structure at the resin–dentin interface. Because the primer is milder than phosphoric acid etchants, the etch pattern produced in uncut enamel is shallower than with an etch-and-rinse technique.

== Clinical performance ==
Most published clinical data on CLEARFIL SE Bond come from restorations placed in non-carious cervical lesions (Class V), with retention as the primary outcome.

A research group at KU Leuven followed one cohort over more than a decade, reporting 97% retention at eight years and continued good clinical performance at thirteen years; selective enamel etching had only a minor positive effect on marginal integrity and marginal discoloration, and did not significantly affect retention. A 2010 two-year trial in restorations placed by general dentists without specialised adhesive-research experience reported 81–84% retention. A two-year trial by Türkün comparing CLEARFIL SE Bond with the etch-and-rinse adhesive Prime&Bond NT found retention rates of 93% and 91%, with no statistically significant difference.

A 2015 meta-analysis of 81 prospective cervical-lesion trials covering 47 adhesives found that two-step self-etch and three-step etch-and-rinse adhesives outperformed one-step self-etch systems and glass-ionomer-based materials on a composite clinical index. A 2021 network meta-analysis of randomised trials in cervical lesions ranked two-step self-etch and three-step etch-and-rinse adhesives among the best-performing strategies. A 2022 systematic review and meta-analysis in Operative Dentistry pooled 14 randomised trials comparing CLEARFIL SE Bond with other adhesives in non-carious cervical lesions and found no statistically significant differences in retention at 12–24 or 36–48 months.

== CLEARFIL SE Bond 2 ==
A successor, CLEARFIL SE Bond 2, uses a 10-MDP-based primer and bonding resin with a modified catalyst system. When combined with a separately sold dual-cure activator, the bonding agent can be cured in dual-cure mode; the manufacturer indicates this mode for indirect restorations and core build-ups.
