= Multilayered zirconia =

Layered dental zirconia CAD/CAM material

Multilayered zirconia (also multilayer zirconia) is a form of yttria-stabilized zirconia used in dentistry to make tooth-coloured crowns and bridges. It is supplied as pre-sintered discs or blocks for computer-aided milling, built from several stacked layers that differ in colour and translucency. A restoration milled from such a blank shades gradually from a more opaque base to a more translucent edge, imitating the change from dentine to enamel in a natural tooth. One of the first commercial multilayered zirconia discs, the KATANA Zirconia ML, was introduced by Kuraray Noritake Dental in 2012; comparable materials are now made by several manufacturers.

== Background ==
Dental zirconia is stabilised with yttria so that it keeps a tetragonal crystal structure at mouth temperature. Materials with about 3 mol% yttria (3Y-TZP) are strong but fairly opaque, whereas raising the yttria content to 4 or 5 mol% increases the proportion of the cubic phase, which makes the ceramic more translucent but lowers its strength. Multilayered discs were developed so that colour and translucency change through the thickness of the blank, which allows a full-contour restoration to be milled from a single block without adding a porcelain veneer.

== Structure and composition ==
The layers of a multilayered blank run from a dentine side to an enamel or incisal side, usually with transition layers between them. Manufacturers use two main approaches. In colour-gradient materials the yttria content is essentially the same in every layer and only the pigment changes, so the layers differ in shade but have similar translucency and strength; the KATANA STML and UTML grades are of this type. In strength-gradient materials the yttria content also changes between layers, for example from about 3 mol% at the dentine side to 5 mol% at the enamel side in IPS e.max ZirCAD Prime. One analysis of the strength-gradient grades KATANA YML and IPS e.max ZirCAD Prime found the highest yttria content, about 5.6 mol%, in the enamel layer of both, and the lowest, about 3.1 mol%, in the body layer of Prime. Because a higher yttria content raises translucency but lowers strength, the enamel layers of these materials are more translucent and have lower flexural strength than the dentine layers. Colouring oxides such as iron(III) oxide are added to individual layers to produce the shade gradient; in one study of a KATANA material iron was present in the dentine layer but not in the enamel layer.

== Properties ==
=== Optical ===
Enamel and dentine layers differ in shade. Whether they also differ in translucency varies by study: one found similar values across the layers of each KATANA grade, another measured more light transmission in the enamel layer of the ML disc. Grades intended for higher translucency, such as the ultra-translucent KATANA UTML, contain more of the cubic phase than the more opaque grades.

=== Mechanical ===
Flexural strength and toughness vary between grades and, in strength-gradient materials, between layers, following the yttria content. In one study the more translucent enamel layers of KATANA YML and IPS e.max ZirCAD Prime had four-point flexural strengths of about 634 and 535 MPa, compared with roughly 900 to 990 MPa for their stronger body layers; specimens cut across the layers had strengths between these values, indicating the interfaces did not form a weak point. A separate study of the KATANA ML, STML and UTML grades found the reverse: beams cut across the layers failed at about 30% lower stress than beams from a single layer, which the authors put down to weak interfaces. Other work has measured the wear of translucent multilayer zirconia against enamel and the fracture resistance of crowns as a function of yttria content.

=== Low-temperature degradation ===
Zirconia can undergo low-temperature degradation, a slow surface transformation of the tetragonal phase in a moist environment. The lower-yttria, more tetragonal layers are the more susceptible; in one comparison of KATANA grades only the least translucent grade showed measurable degradation.

== Processing ==
Multilayered discs are supplied partly sintered so that they can be milled, and are then sintered to full density. Because the sintering schedule affects a zirconia's translucency and grain structure, conventional, speed- and high-speed protocols have been compared for these materials.

== Manufacturers ==
Multilayered zirconia discs and blocks are made by several dental manufacturers. Kuraray Noritake produces the KATANA range, which includes the ML, STML, HTML, UTML and YML grades; Ivoclar produces IPS e.max ZirCAD Multi and ZirCAD Prime. Amann Girrbach's Ceramill Zolid is another colour-gradient material used in comparative studies. Kuraray Noritake holds patents on a layered-ceramic manufacturing method and has licensed them to other companies.

== Cementation ==
Restorations milled from multilayered zirconia are cemented in the same way as other zirconia restorations. Because zirconia has no glass phase, the hydrofluoric acid etching used for silica-based ceramics does not create a durable bond; instead, clinical evidence supports air-abrading the bonding surface with alumina particles at moderate pressure and using a primer or luting resin that contains a phosphate monomer such as 10-MDP. This three-step approach of air-particle abrasion, primer and adhesive resin cement is known as the APC concept.

== See also ==
- Yttria-stabilized zirconia
- Crown (dentistry)
- CAD/CAM dentistry
- Dental restoration
