= 12-Methacryloyloxydodecylpyridinium bromide =

Antibacterial dental resin monomer

Names
- IUPAC name 1-[12-(2-Methylprop-2-enoyloxy)dodecyl]pyridin-1-ium bromide
- Other names MDPB

Identifiers
CAS Number	148753-80-4
3D model (JSmol)	Interactive image
CompTox Dashboard (EPA)	DTXSID00432423
- InChI: InChI=1S/C21H34NO2.BrH/c1-20(2)21(23)24-19-15-10-8-6-4-3-5-7-9-12-16-22-17-13-11-14-18-22;/h11,13-14,17-18H,1,3-10,12,15-16,19H2,2H3;1H/q+1;/p-1 Key: NGRNLZCYRVFRFP-UHFFFAOYSA-M
- SMILES: C=C(C)C(=O)OCCCCCCCCCCCC[n+]1ccccc1.[Br-]

Properties
Chemical formula	C_{21}H_{34}BrNO_{2}
Molar mass	412.412 g·mol^{−1}
- Except where otherwise noted, data are given for materials in their standard state (at 25 °C [77 °F], 100 kPa). Infobox references

12-Methacryloyloxydodecylpyridinium bromide (MDPB) is an antibacterial monomer used in dental resin materials. It joins a quaternary ammonium antibacterial group, dodecylpyridinium bromide, to a polymerisable methacrylate group, so that the compound can copolymerise with other dental monomers and become fixed within the set polymer. Before curing, MDPB is a strong bactericide; once polymerised it is held in the resin network and acts on bacteria by contact, without being released from the material.

MDPB was first synthesized and reported in 1994 by Satoshi Imazato and co-workers at Osaka University. It has been incorporated into experimental resin composites and dentine primers, and it is the antibacterial component of the commercial self-etch adhesive CLEARFIL Protect Bond, later sold as CLEARFIL SE Protect. A 2015 systematic review identified that product as the only marketed dental adhesive then known to contain an antibacterial monomer.

== Development ==
Earlier attempts to give resin composites antibacterial activity by adding agents such as chlorhexidine ran into a common problem: the agent leached out of the set material, which could affect its mechanical properties and shorten the antibacterial effect. To avoid this release, Imazato and colleagues combined an antibacterial dodecylpyridinium bromide with a methacryloyl group to make a polymerisable monomer, MDPB, which could be built into the resin and held in place after curing.

The monomer was first reported in a resin composite in 1994. In that study the cured material released no antibacterial component into water over 90 days, and adding the monomer left the mechanical properties of the composite largely unchanged. A separate 1994 study reported that incorporating MDPB did not impair, and in some measures improved, the curing of Bis-GMA-based composites. In 1997 the group added MDPB to an experimental dentine primer at concentrations of 1, 2 or 5%, a step towards using the monomer in adhesive systems.

== Structure and antibacterial action ==
MDPB is a quaternary ammonium compound in which a pyridinium ring carries a long dodecyl chain and is linked to a methacrylate group. Quaternary ammonium antibacterials carry a positive charge that binds to the negatively charged cell membrane of bacteria and disrupts it, causing the cell contents to leak out.

In its unpolymerised form MDPB kills a range of oral bacteria. Against Streptococcus mutans its minimum inhibitory concentration is comparable to that of triclosan. Its minimum bactericidal concentration against seven species of oral streptococci is about 31 to 63 µg/ml, and at 500 µg/ml or more it kills the bacteria within one minute; no toxic effect on cultured cells was seen at concentrations of 10 µg/ml or less. High concentrations kill both planktonic and biofilm cells rapidly, while low concentrations of about 4 to 8 µg/ml slow the growth and acid production of S. mutans. Once the monomer is polymerised, the antibacterial group is fixed in the resin and no longer leaches out, so the set material inhibits bacteria that touch its surface rather than by releasing an agent.

== Use in dental materials ==
=== Experimental materials ===
MDPB has been studied as an additive in resin composites and in dentine primers, where it provides antibacterial activity without a separate releasing agent. In these materials the immobilised monomer is intended to reduce bacterial colonisation of the restoration surface and to act on bacteria remaining in the dentine of a prepared cavity.

=== Commercial use ===
MDPB is used in the self-etch adhesive CLEARFIL Protect Bond (Kuraray), whose primer contains 5% MDPB; laboratory testing found the primer inhibited oral bacteria. The product, later marketed as CLEARFIL SE Protect, was the first commercially available dental adhesive to contain an antibacterial monomer, and a 2015 systematic review found it was still the only one. The approach of fixing a quaternary ammonium group in the set resin, rather than releasing an antibacterial agent, has since guided the design of other experimental antibacterial monomers for dental use.

=== Antibacterial effect in dentine ===
MDPB-containing dentine primers have been studied for their effect on bacteria within tooth tissue. A 2001 study reported that such a primer had a bactericidal effect on bacteria in human carious dentine, and a 2004 study reported antibacterial effects in vivo. A 2006 independent in vitro comparison found that the primer of CLEARFIL Protect Bond produced larger zones of inhibition, and lower bacterial recovery against Streptococcus mutans, than chlorhexidine-, benzalkonium chloride- and hydrogen peroxide-based cavity disinfectants.

== See also ==
- 10-Methacryloyloxydecyl dihydrogen phosphate, an adhesion-promoting dental monomer developed by Kuraray
- Dental composite
- Dental bonding
- Quaternary ammonium cation
