= Veneer (dentistry) =

Layer of material placed over a tooth

Porcelain veneers
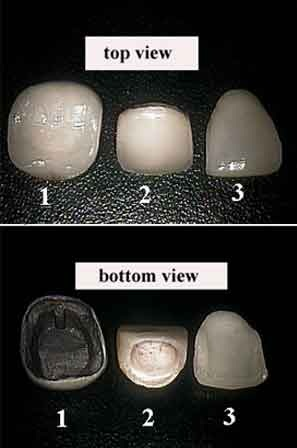
- Comparison between a porcelain-metal dental crown, an all-porcelain dental crown and a porcelain veneer laminate
- MeSH: D003801

In dentistry, a veneer is a layer of material placed over a tooth. Veneers can improve the aesthetics and function of the teeth and protect the tooth's surface from damage.

There are two main types of material used to fabricate a veneer: composite and dental porcelain. A composite veneer may be directly placed (built-up in the mouth), or it can be indirectly fabricated by a dental technician in a dental lab, and later bonded to the tooth, typically using a resin cement. They are commonly used for treatment of adolescent patients who will require a more permanent design once they are fully grown. The lifespan of a composite veneer is approximately four years. In contrast, a porcelain veneer may only be indirectly fabricated. A full veneer crown is described as "a restoration that covers all the coronal tooth surfaces (mesial, distal, facial, lingual and occlusal)". Laminate veneer, on the other hand, is a thin layer that covers only the surface of the tooth and is generally used for aesthetic purposes. These typically have better performance and aesthetics and are less plaque retentive.

== Medical uses ==
Veneers are prosthetic devices, by prescription only, used by the cosmetic dentist. A dentist may use one veneer to restore a single tooth or veneer with high quality that may have been fractured or discolored, or, in most cases, multiple teeth on the upper arch to create a big bright "Hollywood" type of smile makeover. Many people have small teeth resulting in spaces that may not be easily closed by orthodontics. Some people have worn away the edges of their teeth resulting in a prematurely aged appearance, while others may have a malpositioned tooth or teeth that appear crooked. Multiple veneers can close these spaces; lengthen teeth that have been shortened by wear; fill the black triangles between teeth caused by gum recession; provide a uniform color, shape, and symmetry; and make the teeth appear straight. Dentists also recommend using thin porcelain veneers to strengthen worn teeth. They are also applied to yellow teeth that will not whiten. Thin veneers are an effective option for aging patients with worn dentition. In many cases, minimal to no tooth preparation is needed when using porcelain veneers.

While the final veneers are being created, the dentist can make temporaries, usually out of composite. These are not normally indicated but can be used if the patient is complaining of sensitivity or aesthetics. Temporaries act as a trial-run for the final veneers, allowing the dentist to observe the patient's ability to eat and talk with veneers, as well as observing the patient's satisfaction with the veneers. This trial-run is overall used to assist in the final installation of veneers by allowing the patient to be sure of what result they would like to achieve.

== Indications ==
Discolored teeth, malformed teeth, enamel hypoplasia (not enough enamel), enamel hypocalcification (enamel not fully mineralized), fluorosis, tetracycline staining, non-vital tooth discoloration, malposition, enamel fractures, enamel loss by erosion, attrition or abfraction, modifying the shape of the tooth.

== Contraindications ==
In a controversial opinion, Dr. Michael Zuk, a Canadian DDS, profiles in his opinion and problems of overuse of porcelain veneers by certain cosmetic dentists in 'Confessions of a Former Cosmetic Dentist'. He suggests that the use of veneers for 'instant orthodontics' or simulated straightening of the teeth can be harmful, especially for younger people with healthy teeth. Leading dentists caution that minor superficial damage or normal wear to the teeth is not justification for porcelain or ceramic veneers. This is because the preparation needed to apply a veneer may in some cases destroy 3–30% of the tooth's surface if performed by an inexperienced dentist. It has been found that after 10 years, 50% of veneers are either displaced, need re-treatment, or are no longer in satisfactory condition.

Some cosmetic dentists may push unnecessarily for prosthodontic treatment in adolescents or young to middle-aged adults who have otherwise healthy teeth that only necessitate whitening or more routine cleaning. As preparation for veneers requires shaving down the tooth in some cases, sensitivity and decay will be a problem even if the procedure is properly performed. In addition, a veneer's maintenance cost can also be prohibitive for many individuals. Veneer placement should be limited to individuals with significant aesthetic problems, such as badly cracked or broken teeth, that do not meet the requirements for a crown or full replacement.

Additional contraindications include but are not limited to the following: poor oral hygiene, uncontrolled gingival disease, high cavities rate, parafunction, no enamel, unreasonable patient expectations, large existing restorations.

== Classification ==
Several classification systems are possible for veneers. One system suggested in 2012 is called the Nankali Veneer Classification and divides the veneers as follows:

- Labial surface coverage
  - No incisal involvement: Veneers that do not cover the incisal edge of the tooth.
  - Feathered incisal edge: Veneers that slightly overlap the incisal edge without significant coverage.
  - Incisal overlap: Veneers that extend over the incisal edge for added coverage and durability.
- Interproximal preparations
  - No contact point involvement: Veneers that do not involve the contact points between adjacent teeth.
  - Contact point level: Veneers that reach up to the contact points.
  - Passed contact point: Veneers that extend beyond the contact points for more comprehensive coverage.
- Methods of production
  - Indirect veneers
  - Direct veneers
- Materials
  - Feldspathic and leucite-reinforced ceramics
  - Lithium disilicate ceramics
  - Acrylic (no longer in use for quality work)
  - Composite
  - Zirconia

== Types of veneer preparations ==
There are four basic preparation designs for porcelain laminate veneers: window, feather, bevel, and incisal overlap.

Recent technological advances have been made which allow the construction of ultra-thin porcelain laminate veneers. These veneers require only very modest, or in some instances, no reduction of the tooth structure. These are often referred to as "non-prep" veneers.

== Alternatives ==
In the past, the only way to correct dental imperfections was to cover the tooth with a crown. Today, in most cases, there are several possibilities from which to pick: crown, composite resin bonding, cosmetic contouring or orthodontics.

== History ==
Veneers were invented by California dentist Charles Pincus in 1928 to be used for a film shoot for temporarily changing the appearance of actors' teeth. Later, in 1937 he fabricated acrylic veneers to be retained by denture adhesive, which were only cemented temporarily because there was very little adhesion. The introduction of etching in 1959 by Dr. Michael Buonocore aimed to follow a line of investigation of bonding porcelain veneers to etched enamel. Research in 1982 by Simonsen and Calamia revealed that porcelain could be etched with hydrofluoric acid, and bond strengths could be achieved between composite resins and porcelain that were predicted to be able to hold porcelain veneers on to the surface of a tooth permanently. This was confirmed by Calamia in an article describing a technique for fabrication, and placement of etched bonded porcelain veneers using a refractory model technique and Horn describing a platinum foil technique for veneer fabrication. Additional articles have proven the long-term reliability of this technique.

Today, with improved cements and bonding agents, they typically last 10–30 years. They may have to be replaced in this time due to cracking, leaking, chipping, discoloration, decay, shrinkage of the gum line and damage from injury or tooth grinding. The cost of veneers can vary depending on the experience and location of the dentist. In the US, costs range anywhere from $1,000 a tooth upwards to $3,000 a tooth as of 2011. Porcelain veneers are more durable and less likely to stain than veneers made of composite.

Recent longitudinal studies have assessed the survival rates of porcelain laminate veneers over extended periods. Findings suggest that with proper case selection and maintenance, veneers exhibit high survival rates, with minimal complications such as marginal discoloration or secondary caries.

They are sometimes known as Turkey teeth.

== See also ==
- CAD/CAM Dentistry
- Cosmetic dentistry
- Crown (dentistry)
- Dental restoration
- Light activated resin
- Prosthetic dentistry
