= Dental porcelain =

Type of material used in dentistry

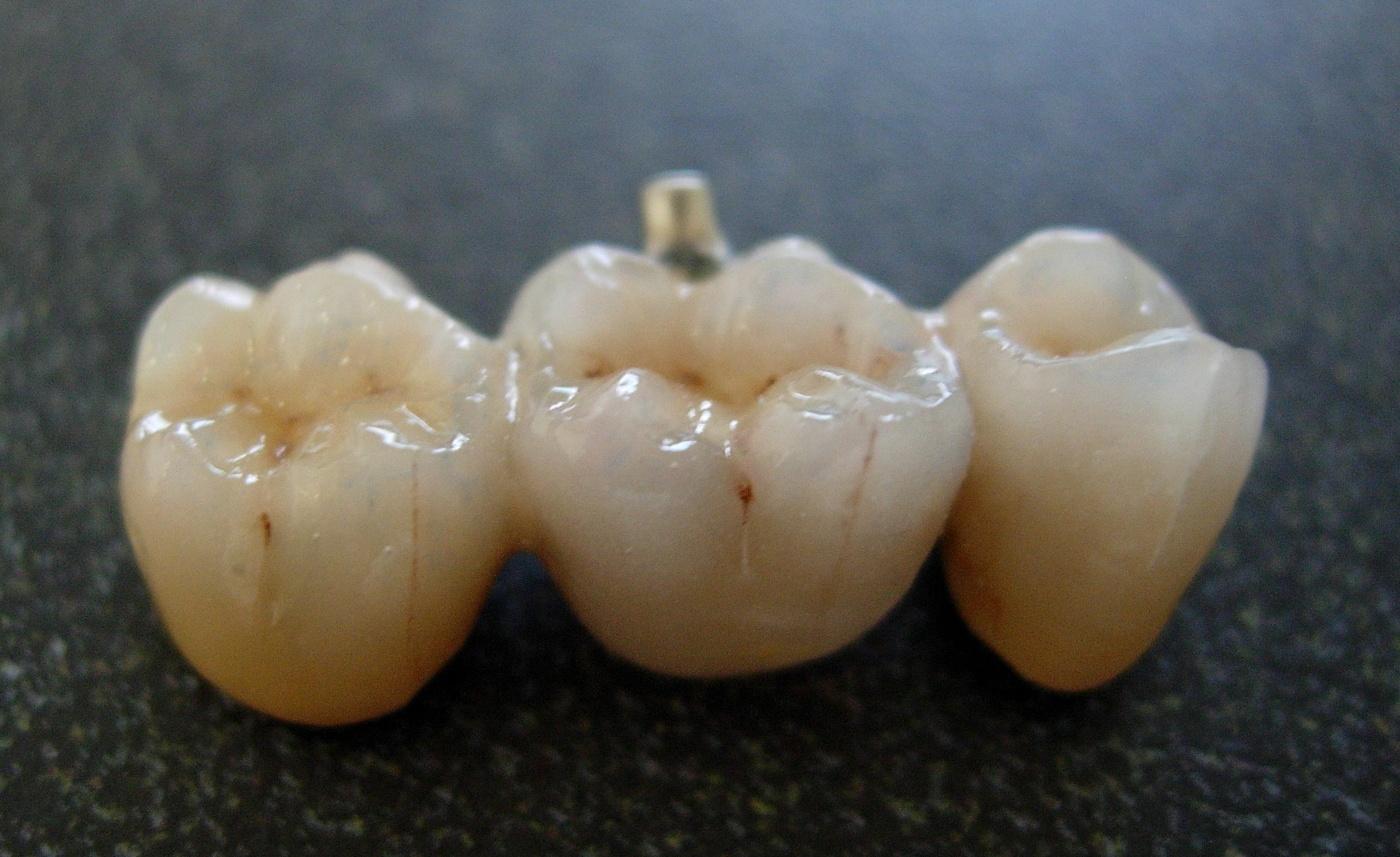
Dental bridge made of porcelain

Dental porcelain (also known as dental ceramic) is a dental material used by dental technicians to create biocompatible lifelike dental restorations, such as crowns, bridges, and veneers. Evidence suggests they are an effective material as they are biocompatible, aesthetic, insoluble and have a hardness of 7 on the Mohs scale. For certain dental prostheses, such as three-unit molars porcelain fused to metal or in complete porcelain group, zirconia-based restorations are recommended.

The word "ceramic" is derived from the Greek word κέραμος keramos, meaning "potter's clay". It came from the ancient art of fabricating pottery where mostly clay was fired to form a hard, brittle object; a more modern definition is a material that contains metallic and non-metallic elements (usually oxygen). These materials can be defined by their inherent properties including their hard, stiff, and brittle nature due to the structure of their inter-atomic bonding, which is both ionic and covalent. In contrast, metals are non-brittle (display elastic behavior), and ductile (display plastic behaviour) due to the nature of their inter-atomic metallic bond. These bonds are defined by a cloud of shared electrons with the ability to move easily when energy is applied. Ceramics can vary in opacity from very translucent to very opaque. In general, the more glassy the microstructure (i.e. noncrystalline) the more translucent it will appear, and the more crystalline, the more opaque.

== Composition ==
Ceramic used in dental application differs in composition from conventional ceramic to achieve optimum aesthetic components such as translucency.

As example the composition of dental feldspathic porcelain is as follows:

- Kaolin 3-5%
- Quartz (silica) 12-25%
- Feldspar 70-85%
- Metallic colourants 1%
- Glass up to 15%

== Classification ==
Ceramics can be classified based on the following:

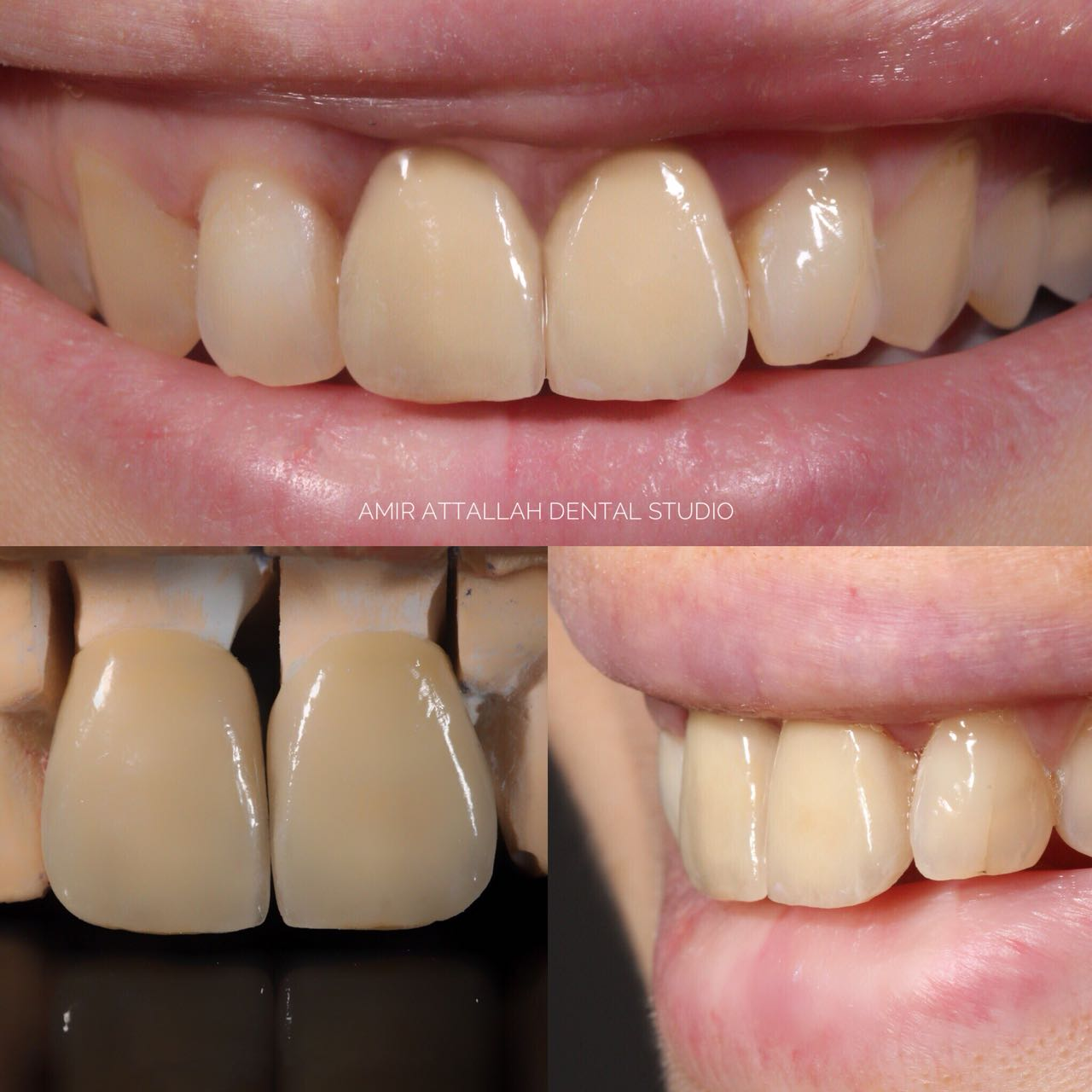
Feldspathic porcelain fabricated on a dental model, then clinically cemented on the central anterior teeth

=== Classification by Microstructure ===
At the microstructural level, ceramics can be defined by the nature of their composition of amorphous-to-crystalline ratio. There can be an infinite variability of the microstructures of materials, but they can be broken down into four basic compositional categories, with a few subgroups:

- Composition category 1 – glass-based systems (mainly silica), example is the feldspathic porcelain.
- Composition category 2 – glass-based systems (mainly silica) with fillers, usually crystalline (typically leucite or, more recently, lithium disilicate)
- Composition category 3 – crystalline-based systems with glass fillers (mainly alumina)
- Composition category 4 – polycrystalline solids (alumina and zirconia).

Dental ceramic is generally regarded as biologically inert. However, other toxicities may exist from depleted uranium as well as some of the other accessory materials; in addition, the restoration may increase wear on opposing teeth.

=== Classification by Processing Technique ===
- Powder/liquid, glass-based systems
- Machinable or pressable blocks of glass-based systems
- CAD/CAM or slurry, die-processed, mostly crystalline systems

=== Classification of crystalline ceramics ===
Classification of crystalline ceramics
	Fabrication technique	Crystalline phase
Metal-ceramics	Sintering	Leucite
Metal-ceramics	Heat-pressing on metal	Leucite, leucite & fluorapatite
All-ceramics	Sintering	Leucite
All-ceramics	Heat-pressing	Leucite, lithium disilicate
All-ceramics	Dry pressing and sintering	Alumina
All-ceramics	Slip-casting & glass infiltration	Alumina, spinel, alumina-zirconia (12Ce-TZP)
All-ceramics	Soft machining & glass-infiltration	Alumina, alumina-zirconia (12Ce-TZP)
All-ceramics	Soft machining & sintering	Alumina, zirconia (3Y-TZP)
All-ceramics	Soft machining, sintering & heat-pressing	Zirconia/fluorapatite-leucite glass-ceramic
All-ceramics	Hard machining	Sanidine, leucite
All-ceramics	Hard machining & heat treatment	Lithium disilicate

== Types of dental ceramics ==
The range of dental ceramics determined by their respective firing temperatures are:

- Ultra-low

Fired below 850 °C - mainly used for shoulder ceramics (aims to combat the problem of shrinkage, specifically at the margins of the prep, when the early sintered ceramic state is fired to produce the final restoration), to correct minor defects and to add colour/shading to restorations

- Low fusing

Fired between 850 and 950 °C - to prevent the occurrence of distortion, this type of ceramic should not be subjected to multiple firings

- Higher fusing

This type is used mainly for denture teeth

== Laboratory procedure ==
The dentist will usually specify a shade or combination of shades for different parts of the restoration, which in turn corresponds to a set of samples containing the porcelain powder. There are two types of porcelain restorations:

- Porcelain fused to metal
- Complete porcelain

Ceramic restorations can be built on a refractory die, which is a reproduction of a prepared tooth made of a strong material with the ability to withstand high temperatures, or it can be constructed on a metal coping or core.

For ceramic fused to metal restorations, the black color of metal is first masked with an opaque layer giving it a shade of white before consecutive layers are built up. The powder corresponding to the desired shade of dentine base is mixed with water before it is fired. Further layers are built up to mimic the natural translucency of the enamel of the tooth. The porcelain is fused to a semi-precious metal or precious metal, such as gold, for extra strength.

Systems which use an aluminium oxide, zirconium oxide or zirconia core instead of metal, produces complete porcelain restorations.

=== Firing ===
Once the mass has been built up, it is fired to allow fusion of the ceramic particles which in turn forms the completed restoration; the process by which this is done is referred to as ‘firing’.

The first firing forces water out and allows the particles to coalesce. During this initial process, a large amount of shrinkage occurs until the mass reaches an almost void-free state; to overcome this the mass is built-up to a size larger than the final restoration will be.

The mass is then left to cool slowly to prevent cracking and reduced strength of the final restoration.

Adding more layers to build up the restoration to the desired shape and/or size requires the ceramic to undergo further rounds of firing.

=== Staining ===
Ceramic can also be stained to show tooth morphology such as occlusal fissures and hypoplastic spots. These stains can be incorporated within the ceramic or applied onto the surface.

=== Glazing ===
Glazing is required to produce a smooth surface and it's the last stage of sealing the surface as it will fill porous areas and prevent wear on opposing teeth. Glazing can be achieved by re-firing the restoration, which fuses outer layers of the ceramic, or by using glazes with lower fusing temperatures; these are applied on the outer surface of the restoration in a thin layer. Any adjustments are then made with polishing rubbers and fine diamonds.

=== Use of CAD-CAM ===
Recent developments in CAD/CAM dentistry uses special partially sintered ceramic (zirconia), glass-bonded ceramic or glass-ceramic (lithium disilicate) formed into machinable blocks, which are fired again after machining.

By utilising in-office CAD/CAM technology, clinicians are able to design, fabricate and place all-ceramic inlays, onlays, crowns and veneers in a single patient visit. Ceramic restorations produced by this method have demonstrated excellent fit, strength and longevity. Two basic techniques can be used for CAD/CAM restorations:

- Chairside single-visit technique
- Integrated chairside–laboratory CAD/CAM procedure

== Ceramic restorations ==
Ceramic restorations are indicated for most dental applications including:

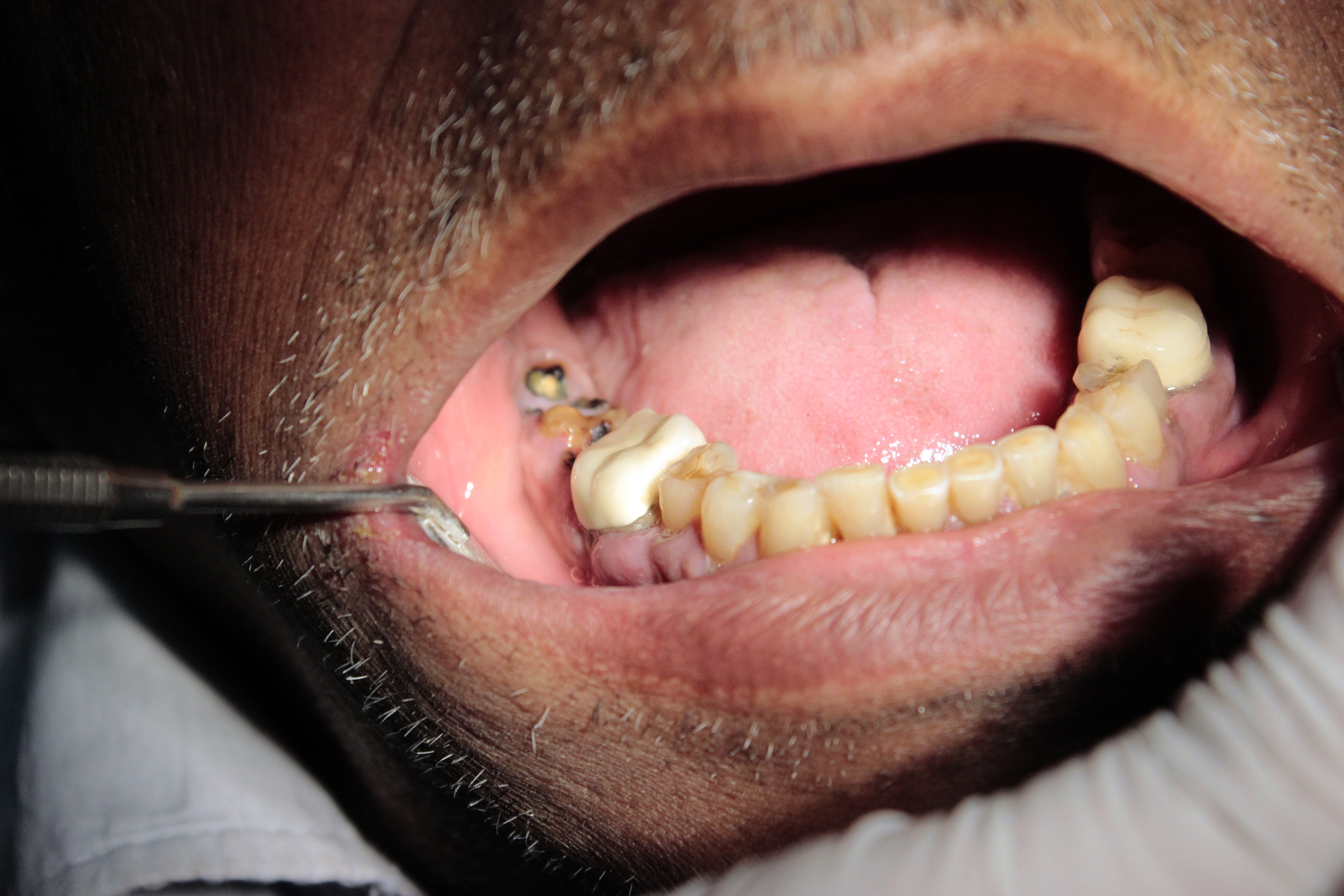
Tooth capping

- Veneers
- Inlays
- Onlays
- Crowns
- Bridges
- Implant supra- and sub-structures
- Denture teeth

However, each system will have its own set of specific indications and contraindications which can be obtained from the manufacturer's guideline.

== Contraindications for ceramic restorations ==
Ceramic restorations are contraindicated when a patient presents with the following:

- Parafunction; individuals who suffer from bruxism or clenching
- Short clinical crown
- Immature teeth
- Unfavourable occlusion
- Supragingival preparations (when used alongside adhesive cements)

== Other uses ==
=== Denture teeth ===
Poly(methyl methacrylate) (PMMA) is the material of choice for denture teeth, however ceramic denture teeth have been, and still are used for this purpose. The main benefit associated with the use of ceramic teeth is their superior wear resistance. There are however a number of disadvantages to using ceramic for denture teeth including their inability to form chemical bonds with the PMMA denture base; rather, ceramic teeth are attached to the base via mechanical retention which increases the chance of debonding during use over time. Additionally, they are more likely to fracture due to their brittle nature.

=== Endodontic posts ===
Ceramic can be used in the construction of non-metallic posts, however, it is a brittle material and as such may fracture within the root canal or may cause fracture of the root due to its increased strength. Another disadvantage is that once placed, removal may not be possible.

=== Veneers ===
Veneers are a prosthetic device dispensed only by doctor's prescription and used by a cosmetic dentist. A dentist can use a single veneer to restore one tooth or a high-quality veneer that may have been broken or discolored, or, in most cases, multiple teeth on the upper jaw to create a brighter smile in a "Hollywood" makeover style. Several veneers can close gaps, lengthen teeth that have been shortened due to wear, fill in black triangles between teeth caused by gum recession, provide uniform color, shape, and symmetry, and straighten teeth. Dentists also recommend using thin porcelain veneers to strengthen worn teeth. They are also applied for yellow teeth that do not whiten. Thin veneers are an effective option for elderly patients with tooth wear. In many cases, minimal or no tooth preparation is required when using porcelain veneers.

The porcelain material used in modern veneers accurately imitates the light-reflective properties of natural tooth enamel, making them virtually indistinguishable from natural teeth. Unlike other cosmetic procedures that look artificial or too perfect, high-quality porcelain veneers transform the smile while maintaining a natural and realistic appearance.

While the final veneers are being made, the dentist can create temporary veneers, usually from composite. These are generally not indicated but can be used if the patient complains of sensitivity or aesthetic issues. Temporary veneers serve as a kind of trial run for permanent veneers, allowing the dentist to assess whether the patient can eat and talk with the veneers as well as evaluate their satisfaction with them. This trial run is generally used to facilitate the final placement of veneers, allowing the patient to understand what outcome they want to achieve.

== Shade selection for ceramic restorations ==
When selecting the color of thin ceramic veneers, the restoration thickness, the shade of the abutment tooth, and the color of the luting Dental cement are taken into account. In comprehensive aesthetic treatment, Tooth whitening is sometimes performed before fabricating ceramic restorations to determine the baseline shade. In a study of feldspathic veneers, increasing the ceramic thickness reduced the deviation from the reference color. These differences were evaluated by Spectrophotometry.
