= Aesthetic anterior composite restoration =

Anterior teeth are some of the most scrutinized teeth, as the size, shape and color of the anterior upper teeth plays an important role in dental aesthetics and smile aesthetics. A few aesthetic anterior problems, such as dental caries, tooth fracture, enamel defects and diastemas, can be solved with composite restorations. Composite restorations can also improve dental aesthetics by changing the shape, color, length and alignment of teeth.

== Medical uses ==
Some uses of direct composite to restore anterior teeth are in:

1. Caries management
2. Repairing fractures of teeth, such as from trauma
3. Diastema closure
  1. Midline diastema are defined as an interdental space greater than 0.5mm within the maxillary central incisors
  2. Diastema can often considered as esthetic or malocclusion problem
  3. Midline diastema often cited from patient as primary esthetic problem, thus closing them is a commonplace in esthetic dentistry
4. Improving esthetic by changing shape, colour, length and alignment

=== Advantages ===
The advantages of these procedures are:

1. Minimally invasive - They require minimal (or no) tooth preparation to enhance resistance and retention form
2. Significant fewer endodontic complications
3. Re-intervention is easier as restoration are more reversible and amenable to repair
4. Reduced risk of wear to opposing teeth
5. Time saving- Only require single appointment
6. Require no provisional restoration
7. Lower financial cost
8. Chipping can be repaired by adding new composite layers, and colour changes sometimes can be fixed by composite resin polishing.

=== Longevity ===
While there is a lack of conclusive data regarding the longevity of anterior composite restoration, it has been well established that the more complex the restoration, the shorter its lifespan. Clinical studies have found that 60 to 80% of all Class III and V composite resin restorations remain acceptable after 5 years of clinical service. The main reason for replacement of anterior composite are typically surface discoloration, secondary caries and fracture of restoration. It is generally accepted that Class IV restorations do not last as long as Class III and Class V. One study compared four different anterior composite restoration types over 5 years. Variables assessed included handling characteristics, gingival condition, surface staining, marginal staining, color deterioration, and overall longevity. The Class IV restorations had higher failure rates than Class III or V restorations.

=== Technique sensitivity ===
Operators should have detailed anatomical knowledge and artistic skill, for example, optimal properties of natural teeth, tooth proportions and their relationships to each other and to the surrounding soft tissues. Operator also must select appropriate restorative materials that match adjacent residual tooth tissue.

== Complications ==
Possible complications include:

1. Post-operative sensitivity
2. Marginal discoloration
3. Restoration de-bond
4. Wear of opposing teeth
5. Iatrogenic damage
6. Pulpal Injury
7. Restoration removal results in an increase in cavity size

== Fractured tooth ==
Steps to restore anterior fractured tooth:

1. A diagnostic cast and wax up
2. Fabricate lingual matrix - an impression of the lingual surface using additional silicone (Polyvinyl siloxane) -.
3. Isolation with rubber dam
4. Beveling the margins -
  1. 75 degree bevel at the facial side using diamond bur, followed by infinite bevel extending to middle third.
  2. 45 degree at Lingual side using diamond bur
5. Etching with phosphoric acid to the enamel including all beveled surfaces
  1. Etching time based on manufacturer's instruction
  2. Etchant is rinsed off
6. Application of bonding agent. Agitate the bonding agent against the enamel surface. Use a gentle stream of air to evaporate the solvent. Light polymerize the bonding agent
7. Seat lingual matrix, ensuring proper fit.
8. Apply a thin layer of composite onto matrix. Next thicken the area near the fracture line to hide the demarcation.
9. Shape the body shade into mimic anatomical lobes of the specific tooth, leaving 1 mm short of the incisal edge to be used with more translucent enamel shades to create halo effect
10. Finish the surface with polishing disks, with care taken to mimic the contours of the tocontralateraloth.

== Direct composite veneer ==
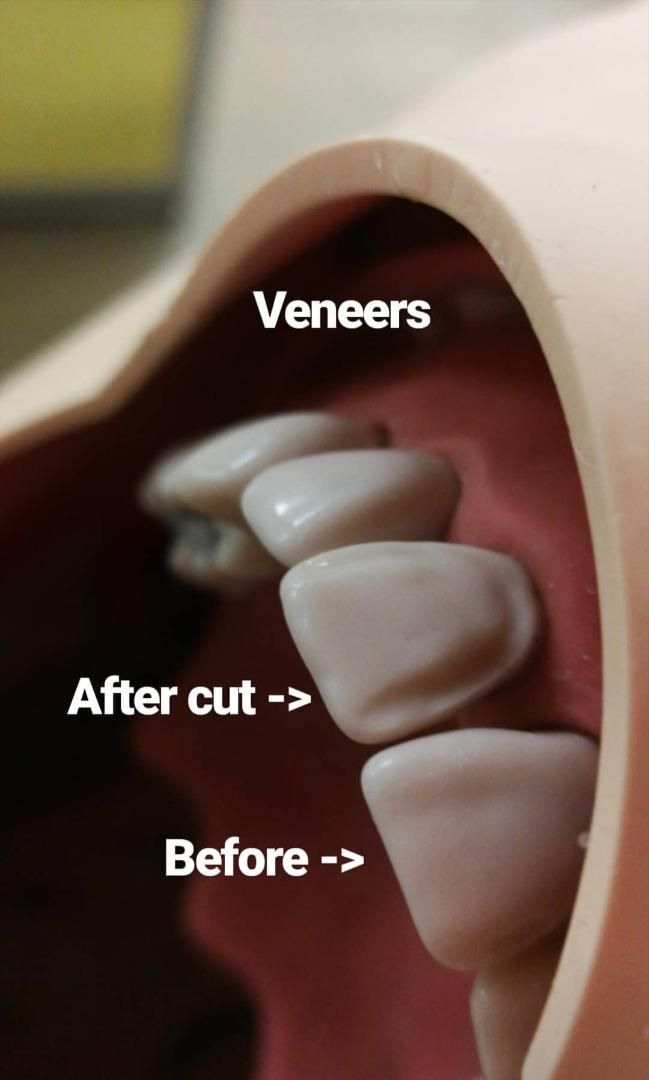
Veneer preparation

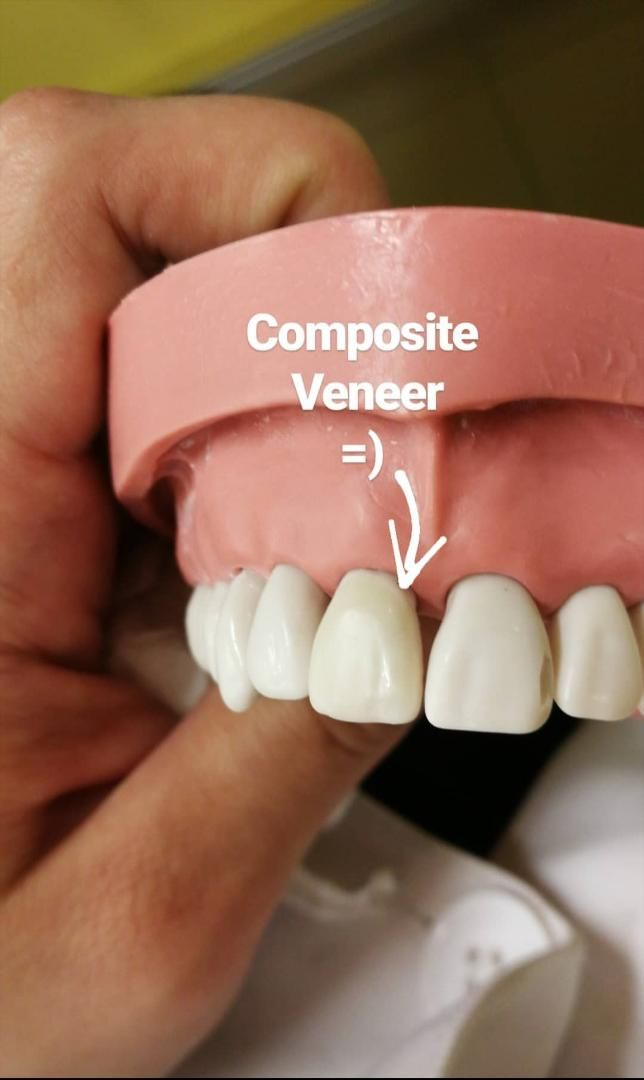
Composite veneer

Dental veneers covers the front surface of teeth. Veneers with direct resins are one of the common treatment options for clinical applications following the developments in adhesive and restorative dentistry in recent years. These restorations are applied on prepared tooth surfaces or even without any preparation, with an adhesive agent and a composite resin material directly in a single visit in the dental clinic. If done properly, the aesthetic outcomes of direct composite veneers are very satisfactory in addition to superior optical and physical properties. In recent history these restorations were thought to be temporary alternatives to indirect ceramic veneers; however, they are no longer named 'day savior fillings' today. These restorations are called minimally invasive, functional and long-lasting 'direct aesthetic restorations' that perfectly emulate natural dental tissues even in anterior area. 3,4 Discolorations of teeth or restorations, dental malformations or mal-positions, diastemas, crown fractures and abrasive or erosive defects are some examples of up-to-date indications of direct composite veneers. 1 Enamel hypoplasia is a developmental malformation generally resulting in poor aesthetics, tooth sensitivity, malocclusion and predisposition to dental caries. 5 Direct composite veneer restorations where the whole labial surface is covered with resin, are good treatment options in such cases.,6 The conventional workflow sequence of a direct composite veneer is:

1. Determine if composite veneers is the best option for the patient.
  1. Advantage of composite veneers is it takes much less time compared to a lab-fabricated veneer, it only takes one treatment for the preparation and veneer buildup.
  2. Secondly it is a cheaper option compared to other veneer options.
2. Choosing of the composite shade. Composite button samples of different shades are placed on teeth and a dental photography taken
3. impression and cast taken, wax up done on teeth, a silicone index guidance is fabricated
4. Rubber dam as isolation
5. Preparation is done by drilling of a thin layer of tooth structure. depth grooves are used to make the preparation more uniformed.
6. Composite layering with dentin color, and the incisal area with enamel color
7. Finishing with white stone bur, taking care to follow the natural anatomy of adjacent teeth if present
8. Polishing with interdental strip and polishing disk with grains of increasing fineness, finally with a composite polishing paste
9. Follow up with the patient regularly

New method for Aesthetic Anterior direct composite veneers

In the past two and a half years the use of 3D designed and then printed plastic models has become very popular worldwide. The dentist uses a clear, Vinyl Polysiloxane material to make an index of the 3D printed model and this is placed over the patient's two and a flowable highly filled resin is injected into the mould and light cured.

== Composite restoration closing diastema ==
Midline diastema (spacing in upper teeth) is a common occurrence in the population. An arbitrary number for the spacing between the teeth to consider as midline diastema is a width of 0.5 from a proximal surface of a teeth to the proximal surface of adjacent teeth. Midline diastema usually occur in the upper teeth compared to lower. The cause of this spacing includes but not limited to microdontia, labial frenulum, peg-shaped lateral incisors, mesiodens, cysts in midlene region, tongue trusting, finger sucking, dental malformations, maxillary incisor proclination, genetics, imperfect joining of interdental septum, dental skeletal discrepancies. The technical factors affecting the course of treatment of the closing of midline diastema includes the size of the existing central incisors, the amount of reduction necessary, the morphology of existing tooth, and the subsequent possibility of a veneer or crown treatment needs to be taken into account, the patient factors affecting the course of treatment includes economic, psychological and time factors of the patient. With a successful diastema closure, the normal arrangement of teeth can be established Continuous improvement in material science and methodology enables the aesthetics of composite restoration to be of a high standard and realistic in terms of aesthetic, physical and mechanical properties. Composites provides an array of hues, colour and opacities for composite layering techniques which mimics the opalescence of natural teeth. The conventional workflow sequence for a diastema closure is 1)Shade selection was done for dentin shade and enamel shade. Composite button samples of different shades are placed on teeth and a dental photography taken to verify 2)Rubber dam isolation 3)Placing a retraction cord. 3)Etching enamel surface, 4)Application of bonding agent. Agitate the bonding agent against the enamel surface. Use a gentle stream of air to evaporate the solvent. Light polymerize the bonding agent 5)Layer dentin layer, followed by enamel shade 6)finishing with white stone bur, taking care to follow the natural anatomy 7)polishing with interdental strip and polishing disk with grains of increasing fineness, finally with a composite polishing paste.
