= 10-Methacryloyloxydecyl dihydrogen phosphate =

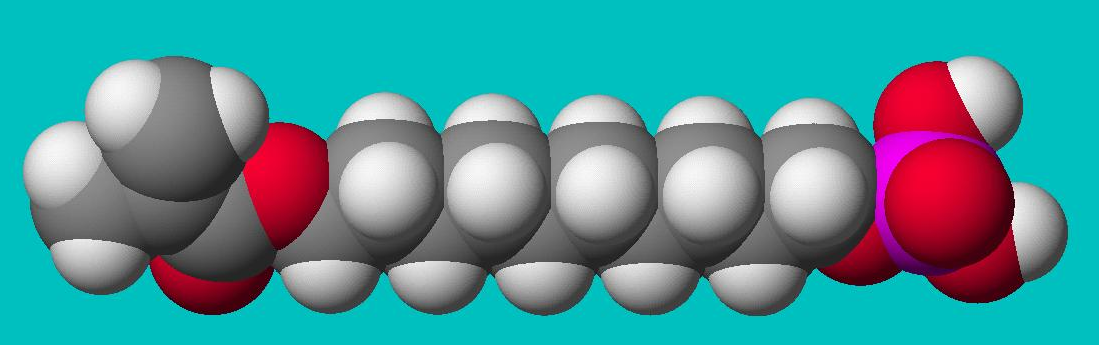

Names
- Preferred IUPAC name Decane-1,10-diyl dihydrogen phosphate 2-methylprop-2-enoate

Identifiers
CAS Number	85590-00-7
3D model (JSmol)	Interactive image
ChemSpider	119018
PubChem CID	135071
CompTox Dashboard (EPA)	DTXSID80234806
- InChI: InChI=1S/C14H27O6P/c1-13(2)14(15)19-11-9-7-5-3-4-6-8-10-12-20-21(16,17)18/h1,3-12H2,2H3,(H2,16,17,18) Key: CFKBCVIYTWDYRP-UHFFFAOYSA-N
- SMILES: CC(=C)C(=O)OCCCCCCCCCCOP(=O)(O)O

Properties
Chemical formula	C_{14}H_{27}O_{6}P
Molar mass	322.338 g·mol^{−1}
- Except where otherwise noted, data are given for materials in their standard state (at 25 °C [77 °F], 100 kPa). Infobox references

10-Methacryloyloxydecyl dihydrogen phosphate (10-MDP, MDP Monomer) is a chemical compound used in dental adhesive materials. This organophosphate monomer was developed in 1981 by the Japanese company Kuraray for the preparation of dental adhesion polymers

== Synthesis ==
MDP is synthesized according to the following reactions: at first, 10-hydroxydecyl methacrylate is synthesized by reaction of methacrylic acid and 1,10-decanediol. Next, phosphoryl chloride is added to 10-hydroxydecy methacrylate, then, the phosphorus-chlorine bonds in this intermediate are hydrolyzed.

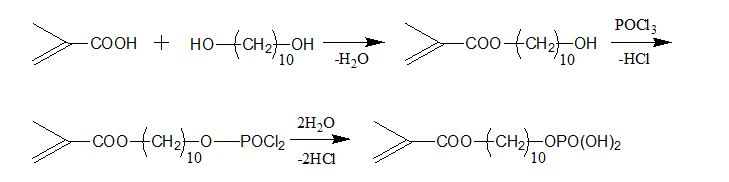

== Background ==
In the late 1970s, tooth adhesion phosphate monomer 2-methacryloyloxethyl phenyl hydrogen phosphate (Phenyl-P) was developed for tooth-saving restoration techniques. 4-Methacryloyloxyethyl trimellitic acid anhydride (4-META) that adheres to not only tooth structures but also dental alloys, was developed almost at the same time. In order to create adhesive monomers having higher performance, investigation and optimization of adhesive monomer molecular structure was carried out. The results of the experiments have provided adhesive monomers with a more suitable chemical structure, and one of those is MDP.

== Research ==
=== MDP-apatite or dentin interactions ===
The adhesive interaction of MDP with synthetic hydroxyapatite was observed using x-ray photoelectron spectroscopy and atomic absorption spectrophotometry. MDP readily adhered to hydroxyapatite and this bond appeared very stable, as confirmed by the low dissolution rate of its calcium salt in water.

MDP, which effectively interacts chemically with hydroxyapatite and the calcium salt of which is hardly soluble, showed no signs of degradation in bond strength. Micro-tensile bond strength (μTBS) to dentin of a self-etch adhesive that contains MDP were measured up to 100,000 thermocycles. The μTBS of the MDP-based adhesive to dentin after 100,000 thermocycles was not significantly different from that of the control.

Experimental primers, which were prepared by three different purity grade MDP monomers, were tested. Impurities and the presence of MDP dimer affected not only hybridization, but also reduced the formation of MDP_Ca salts and nano-layering. MDP in a high purity grade is essential to achieve durable bonding.

=== MDP-collagen interactions ===
The binding interaction between collagen and MDP was studied by saturation transfer difference (STD) NMR spectroscopy. The STD results imply that MDP has a relatively stable interaction with the collagen, because of the hydrophobic interactions between the hydrophobic MDP moieties and the hydrophobic collagen surface.

=== Adhesion to dental metal ===
Tensile bond strengths to titanium plates treated with 3 experimental primers consisting of MDP in 3 concentrations were tested. The data obtained strongly suggest that MDP is effective to improve the adhesive performance of resin to titanium.

=== Adhesion to zirconia ===
Tensile bond strength to zirconia of ethanol solutions that contains MDP were measured. MDP showed high bond strengths to zirconia.

Tensile bond strengths of MDP containing resin composites to zirconia ceramic were statistically significantly higher when compared with the bond strength of the conventional Bis-GMA resin composite which contains no adhesive monomer.

The mechanisms of coordination between MDP and zirconium oxide were demonstrated by using 1H and 31P magic angle spinning nuclear magnetic resonance (NMR) and two dimensional 1H → 31P heteronuclear correlation NMR. The spectra indicated three possible models as mechanisms of interaction of MDP with zirconia.

== See also ==
- Adhesive
- Dental bonding
- Dentine bonding agents
- Dental cement
