= Lithium disilicate =

Names
- IUPAC name Lithium disilicate

Identifiers
CAS Number	66402-68-4
3D model (JSmol)	Interactive image
ChemSpider	129431410
ECHA InfoCard	100.060.291
EC Number	266-340-9
PubChem CID	101943115
UNII	PDM70D5IQL
- InChI: InChI=1S/2Li.O5Si2/c;;1-6(2)5-7(3)4/q2*+1;-2 Key: WVMPCBWWBLZKPD-UHFFFAOYSA-N
- SMILES: [Li+].[Li+].[O-][Si](=O)O[Si](=O)[O-]

Properties
Chemical formula	Li_{2}O_{5}Si_{2}
Molar mass	150.04 g·mol^{−1}
- Except where otherwise noted, data are given for materials in their standard state (at 25 °C [77 °F], 100 kPa). Infobox references

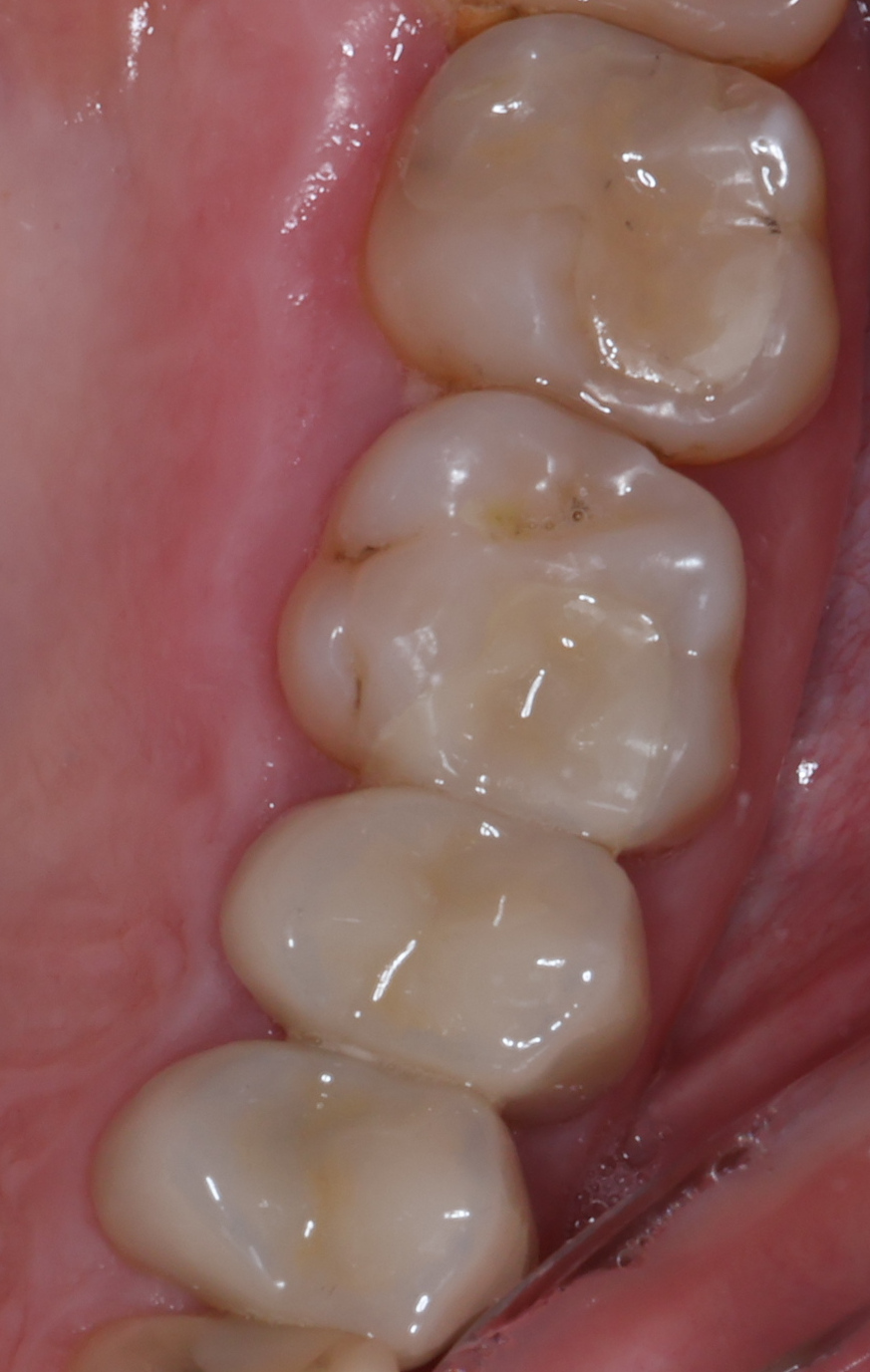
Inlay (Lithium disilicate)

Lithium disilicate (Li_{2}Si_{2}O_{5}) is a chemical compound that is a glass ceramic. It is widely used as a dental ceramic due to its strength, machinability and translucency.

== Use ==
Lithium disilicate has found applications in dentistry as a dental ceramic material for dental restorations such as crowns, bridges, and veneers in the form of Li_{2}Si_{2}O_{5}. Lithium disilicate has an unusual microstructure that consists of many randomly oriented small and interlocking plate-like needle-like crystals. This structure causes cracks to be deflected, blunted, and/or to branch, which prevents cracks from growing. Lithium disilicate has a biaxial flexible strength in the range of 360 MPa to 400 MPa; in comparison, for metal ceramics this is around 80 to 100 MPa, for veneered zirconia it is approximately 100 MPa, and for leucite glass ceramic it is approximately 150 to 160 MPa. It has high hardness (5.92 +/- 0.18 GPa) and fracture toughness (3.3 +/- 0.14 MPa m^{1/2}). In addition, it can be made to have an appearance that very closely resembles that of natural human teeth.

Lithium disilicate is also used as a non-conductive seal, enamel or feed-through insulator in nickel superalloys or stainless steel, as it has a high thermal expansion.
