= Dentine bonding agents =

Adhesive for dental fillings

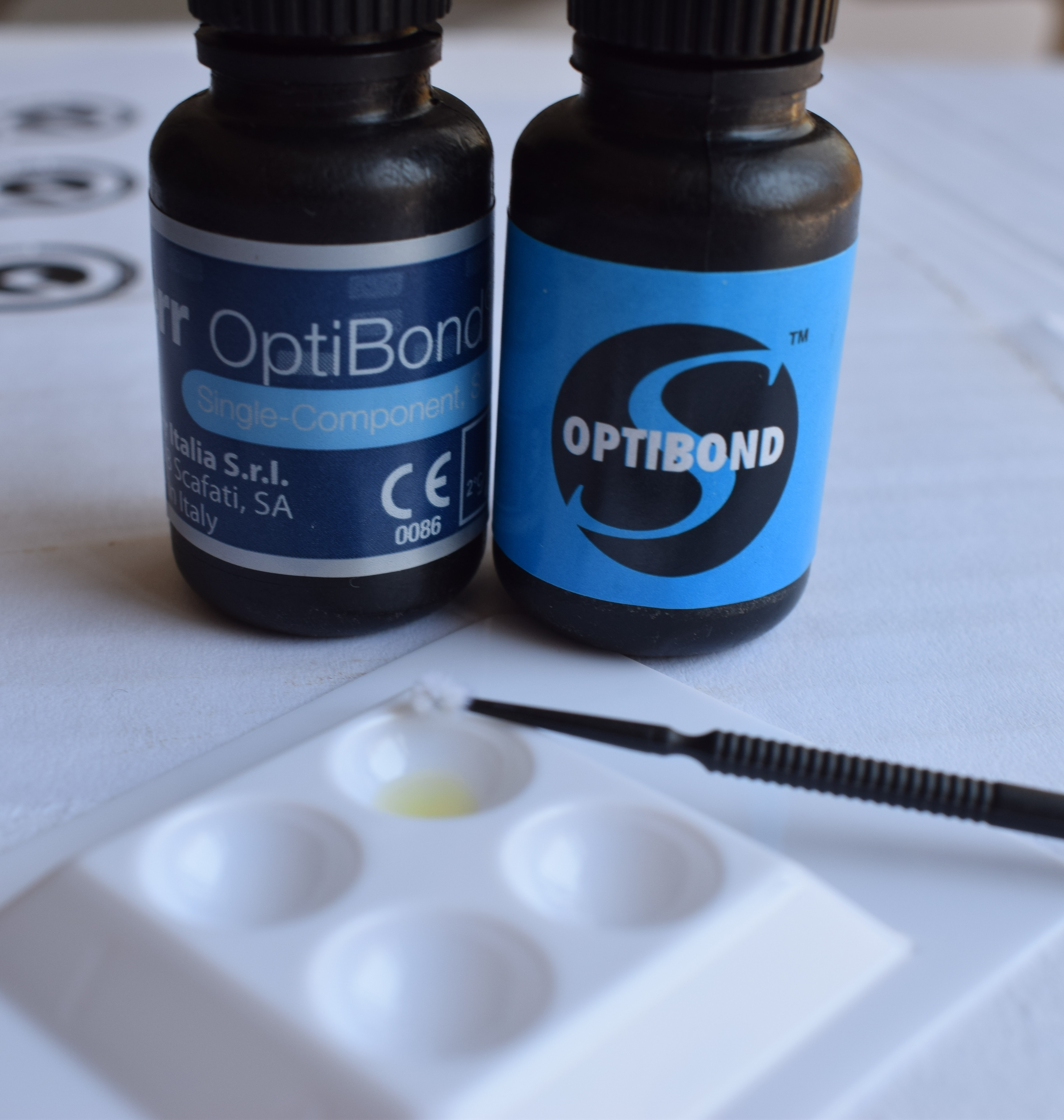
All-in-one self-etch adhesive and a single component universal adhesive, used in the adhesion of direct and indirect dental restorations

Also known as a "bonderizer" bonding agents (spelled dentin bonding agents in American English) are resin materials used to make a dental composite filling material adhere to both dentin and enamel.

Bonding agents are often methacrylates with some volatile carrier and solvent like acetone. They may also contain diluent monomers. For proper bonding of resin composite restorations, dentin should be conditioned with polyacrylic acids to remove the smear layer, created during mechanical treatment with dental bore, and expose some of the collagen network or organic matrix of dentin. Adhesive resin should create the so-called hybrid layer (consisting of a collagen network exposed by etching and embedded in adhesive resin). This layer is an interface between dentin and adhesive resin and the final quality of dental restoration depends greatly on its properties. Modern dental bonding systems come as a “three-step system”, where the etchant, primer, and adhesive are applied sequentially; as a “two-step system”, where the etchant and the primer are combined for simultaneous application; and as a “one-step system”, where all the components should be premixed and applied in a single application (so-called sixth generation of bonding agents).

== Chemical processes involved in bonding to dentine ==
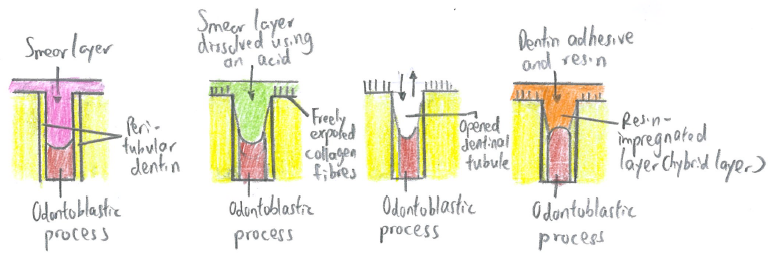
Mechanism of bonding- dentin

1. Removal of the smear layer and etching of dentine
2. Priming of the dentine surface
3. Bonding of the primed dentine surface to the restorative material

=== Removal of the smear layer and dentine etching ===
A dentine conditioning agent is used initially, to remove the smear layer resulting from the preparation of a cavity and, to alter the dentine surface by partially demineralising the intertubulary dentine. This partially demineralised dentine acts as a hollow scaffolding which can be perfused with the primer. Over-etching (as well as over-drying) of the dentine can lead to collapse of the collagen network, making infiltration of the primer more challenging. However, sclerosed dentine requires a longer time of exposure to the dentine conditioner compared to healthy dentine. Some dentine conditioners contain a chemical called glutaraldehyde, which reinforces the collagen matrix, preventing its collapse.

Some common dentine conditioners include:

- phosphoric acid
- nitric acid
- maleic acid
- citric acid
- ethylene diamine tetra-acetic acid (EDTA)

== Dentin bonding ==
=== How does dentinal bonding occur? ===
Dentin bonding refers to process of bonding a resin to conditioned dentin, where mineral component is replaced with resin monomers to form a biocomposite comprising dentin collagen and cured resin. The adhesive-dentin interface forms a tight and permanent bond between dentin and composite resins.

It can be accomplished by either etch-and-rinse (total etch) or self-etch adhesives. In etch-and rinse, acid will dissolve the minerals to a certain depth and leaves the highly porous dentinal collagen network suspended in water. Then, the collagen network is infiltrated with resin monomers. After chemical polymerization of these monomers happen, activated by light cure, it will result in a polymer-collagen biocomposite, commonly known as the hybrid layer:

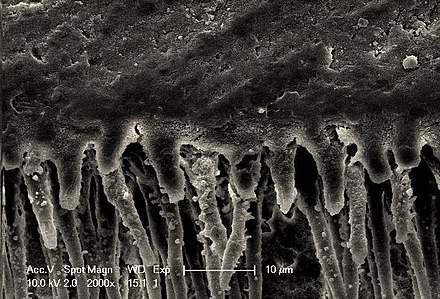
Resin-dentin interface indicating a hybrid layer (Daood et al. 2018)

The mechanism of action is explained below:

a) Application of acid to dentin will result in partial/total removal of smear layer and demineralization of the dentin.

b) Acid will demineralize the intertubular and peritubular dentin, and then open the dentinal tubules while exposing the collagen fibres, hence increasing the microporosity of intertubular dentin.

c) Dentin will be demineralized by up to approximately 7.5 μmeter, depending on the type of acid used, time of application and concentration.

d) Primer system is designed to increase critical surface tension of dentin, which gets decreased after etching of acid.

e) Bonding mechanism is when:

1. Primer and bonding resin are applied to etched dentin, they penetrate the intertubular dentin, forming hybrid layer.
2. They also penetrate and polymerize in open dentinal tubules, forming resin tags.

Moist bonding technique has been shown repeatedly to enhance bond strengths of etch-and-rinse adhesives because water preserves the porosity of collagen network for monomer interdiffusion.

=== Hybrid layer ===
Its presence was identified by Nakabayashi and co-workers where the hybrid layer consists of demineralized intertubular dentin and infiltrated and polymerized adhesive resin.

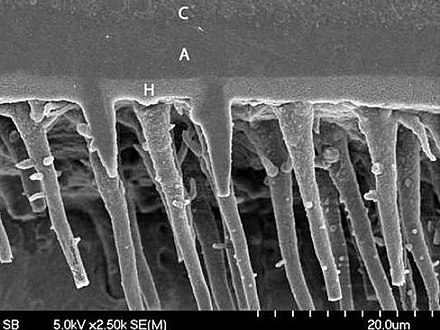
Scanning electron micrograph of the transition between composite resin (C)-adhesive (A), adhesive-hybrid layer (H), and hybrid layer-dentin.

The hybrid layer is hydrophobic, acid resistant and tough. The quality of hybrid layer formed decides the strength of resin dentin interface. When the hybrid layer becomes thicker and more uniform, the bond strength is better.

=== Smear layer and its role in bonding ===
Smear layer refers to a layer of debris on the inorganic surface of substrate which comprises residual inorganic and organic components. This layer is produced whenever the tooth structure undergoes a preparation with a bur.

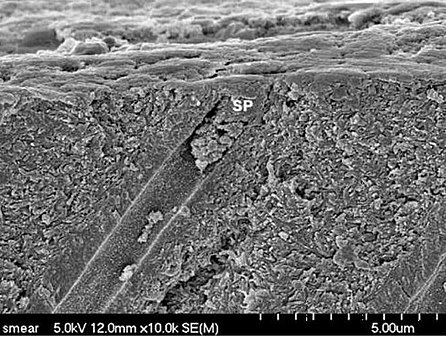
Scanning electron micrograph of a smear plug blocking the entrance of a dentinal tubule. SP, smear plug. (From Sturdevant Art and Science of Operative Dentistry, 7th edition, p155)

Smear layer will fill the orifices of the dentinal tubules, hence forming smear plugs. These smear plugs decrease dentin permeability by 90% and the smear plug alone can prevent adhesive resin penetration into dentinal tubules. The thickness of smear layer can range from 0.5-2 μmeter and for the smear plug, 1 to 10 μmeter.

Smear layer poses some threat for optimal bonding to occur. That is why it needs to be removed. For example, smear layer needs to be removed prior to bonding by etch-and-rinse (total etch) adhesives. This will lead to thicker hybrid layer and long, denser resin tags which results in better bond strength.

=== Carious versus sound dentin for dentinal bonding ===
Some caries excavation methods lead to leaving caries-affected dentin behind to serve as the bonding substrate, mostly in indirect pulp capping.

It is reported that the immediate bond strengths to caries-affected dentin are 20-50% lower than to sound dentin, and even lower with caries-infected dentin. How does caries progression correlates with this? First, it reduces mineral content, increases porosity and changes the dentinal collagen structure and its distribution too. These changes can cause a significant reduction in the mechanical properties in dentin e.g. hardness, stiffness, tensile strength, modulus of elasticity, and shrinkage during drying, which makes dentin in and under hybrid layer more prone to cohesive failures under occlusal forces.

Lower mineral content of the caries-affected dentin will allow phosphoric acid or acidic monomers to demineralize matrix more deeply than in normal dentin, which results in even more residual water in exposed collagen matrix.

=== How to improve resin-dentin bonding? ===
==== Moist dentine ====
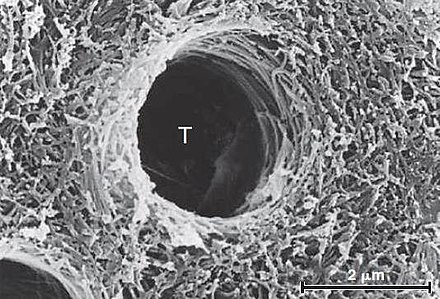
Scanning electron micrograph of dentin that was kept moist after rinsing off the etchant. The abundant intertubular porosity serves as a pathway for the penetration of the dentin adhesive. T, Dentinal tubule. (From Sturdevant Art and Science of Operative Dentistry, 7th edition, p157)

One of the important factors in determining the dentinal bonding is collagen. When dentin is etched, smear layer and minerals from dentinal structure will be removed, hence exposing the collagen fibres. The areas where the minerals are removed are filled with water which functions as plasticizer for collagen and keeps it at expanded soft state. This means that the spaces for resin-dentin bonding are preserved. However, these collagen fibres can collapse in dry condition and if the organic layer of matrix is denatured, this will obstruct the resin to bond with dentin and form a hybrid layer.

Because of this, the presence of moist or wet dentin is required to achieve successful dentin bonding. This is due to presence of water miscible organic solvents like ethanol or acetone in the primers. The acetone trails water and hence improves the penetration of the monomers into the dentin for better micromechanical bonding. Also, water will prevent collagen fibres from collapsing, thus making better penetration and bonding between resin and dentin.

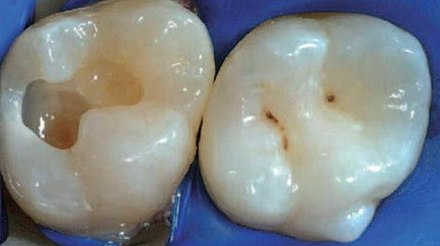
Clinical aspect of moist dentin – a glistening appearance without accumulation of water. (From Rubinstein S, Nidetz A: The art and science of direct posterior restoration: Recreating form, colour and translucency, Alpha Omegan 100(1):30-35, 2007.)

In order to get a moist dentin, it is advisable to not dry dentin with compressed air after rinsing away the etchant. Instead, high volume evacuation suction can be used to remove excess water and then blot the remaining water present on dentin using gauze or cotton. The dentin surface should appear glistening.

If the dentin surface is too wet, water will dilute the resin primer and compete for the sites in collagen network, which will prevent hybrid layer formation.

If the dentin surface is too dry, collapse of collagen fibres and demineralized dentin can occur, leading to low bond strength.

==== Agitation of hydrophilic primer or adhesive during application ====
Besides having adequate dentinal moisture, agitation of the primers during application of two-step etch-and-rinse adhesives may be critical for optimal penetration into the demineralized collagen fibres. It also may aid the evaporation of residual water in the adhesive and hybrid layers, thus preventing nano leakage.

In a clinical trial comparing the performance of Prime & Bond NT using no rubbing action, slight rubbing action and vigorous rubbing action in the restoration of NCCLs, 92.5% of restorations in vigorous rubbing action group were found to retain after 24 months of clinical service. For the other two groups, the retention rates of the restoration were slightly lower, at 82.5%.

== See also ==
- Dental cement

== See also ==
- Dentine bonding agents: an overview
