= Temporary crown =

Short term dental prosthetic

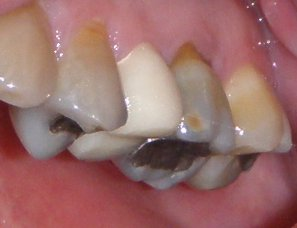
A temporary crown (white) on a tooth after endodontic therapy

A temporary crown (provisional crown, interim crown) is a temporary (short-term) crown used in dentistry. Like other interim restorations, it serves until a final (definitive) restoration can be inserted. Usually the temporary crown is constructed from acrylic resins (monomethacrylate-based/polymethacrylate-based) or, chemical-cure/light cure composite (dimethacrylate-based), although alternative systems using aluminium crown forms are occasionally used. Temporary crowns function to protect the tooth, prevent teeth shifting, provide cosmetics, shape the gum tissue properly, and prevent sensitivity.

== Function ==
The functions of temporary crowns are:

- Maintain the dental aesthetic

Provisional restorations offer dental aesthetics purposes, especially for anterior teeth. A patient can evaluate the aesthetic of the temporary crown if that is to be changed in the definitive restoration.

- Maintain the tooth's function

Overeruption of opposing teeth and drifting of adjacent teeth can be prevented by providing provisional restoration. Masticatory function for posterior teeth can be restored as well.

- Confirm that the tooth preparation is sufficient

These include whether a sufficient tooth has been prepared to accommodate the definitive restoration and any undercuts present will be removed. If deficiencies in the tooth prep are found, these can be rectified and the temporary crowns can be relined or remade.

- Prevent dentine hypersensitivity

Exposed dentinal tubules in vital teeth can be covered with temporary crowns to prevent any dentinal fluid movement

- Prevent coronal leakage

Temporary crowns block bacteria entry to prevent pulpal inflammation and maintain a good coronal seal to the root canal filling.

== Preformed crowns ==
Problems

- preformed crowns are unlikely to fit perfectly, and need chair side adjustments
- a large bank of preformed crowns is required to fit all variations of tooth morphology
1. Polycarbonate crowns

A tooth-coloured shell that is slightly larger than the tooth preparation is selected and is reduced to the correct dimensions using a bur until it seats fully on the tooth preparation without bedding into the gingiva. Petroleum jelly is smeared over the tooth and acrylic resin is spread over the fitting surface of the crown. The shell is removed once the resin has polymerised and the restoration is trimmed until the fit is satisfactory.

2. Plastic crowns Clear plastic crowns can be selected and trimmed with scissors without traumatising the gingiva. Small holes can be made on the canine tips, incisal angles and cusps with a probe before filling crowns with acrylic resin to reduce the risk of bubbles formation. Once the resin has been set, the restoration can be checked for occlusion and margins before being cemented in.

3. Composite crowns Preformed malleable composite crowns are soft and easily moulded to the tooth in situ. They can be partially cured for two to three seconds in the mouth and removed to be fully cured outside the mouth. Final check for occlusion, fit and margins can be carried out prior to cementing provisional restoration.

4. Metal-based crowns When a permanent crown needs replacement or sectioning for caries removal, the original crown can be modified and used as a temporary restoration. The crown can be relined with bis-acrylic composite resin and cemented on temporarily.

== Custom-formed resin replica temporary crown ==
Chairside temporary crowns can be made in the mouth using a suitable mould. It is extremely useful in cases where the tooth to be prepared is structurally intact. The material used is usually that of a bis-acrylic composite material (e.g. ProTemp), or one which consists of the higher acrylics, usually a mixture of poly(ethyl methacrylate) and poly(isobutyl methacrylate). Custom-formed provisional crowns allow for shaping of the gingival tissues in order to achieve a satisfactory emergence profile of the definitive restoration. This is indicated particularly when restoring bone-level dental implants.

=== How to make a custom-formed provisional restoration ===
1. A sectional impression of the tooth to be prepared is made.
2. Prepare the tooth for the chosen design of restoration.
3. A thin layer of petroleum jelly can be smeared onto the preparation to facilitate the removal of the provisional restoration from the tooth once the material is set
4. Syringe the bis-acrylic composite resin into the sectional impression of the tooth that has been prepared, and relocate the impression in the mouth. Ensure that the impression is fully seated over the teeth – an obvious click can often be felt as the impression passes over the bulbosity of the remaining teeth.
5. Remove the impression before the complete polymerisation of the bis-acryl resin. At this stage, the resin will feel like rubber.
6. Once removed from the mouth or impression, any material flash and ledges can be removed with a high speed diamond bur or abrasive polishing discs. The marginal fit and occlusion are checked with the provisional restoration in situ and adjusted if necessary, ideally outside of the mouth.
7. The provisional restoration can then be cemented with a temporary luting cement.
8. Remove excess cement from the margins, carefully using dental floss interproximally.

== Cementing of the temporary restoration ==
An ideal provisional cement should exhibit the following characteristics: capability of retaining the provisional crown for months, but easy on removal of the temporary prosthesis; easy removal of excess cement from around the margins; good marginal seal; and compatibility with provisional restorations. Adhesive cements should be avoided as they are difficult to remove. Eugenol containing products are advantageous as they are adhesive without being difficult to remove. However, eugenol has an inhibitory effect on the polymerisation of methacrylate-based resins, and may potentially lead to lower resin-dentine bond strength.

Prior to the cementation of the provisional crown, the occlusion should be checked. Any deficiencies in the provisional crown can be amended by the addition of more temporary crown and bridge material, or a light cured composite.

If a temporary crown becomes de-cemented, it is important that a dentist examine the patient as overeruption of the opposing teeth may prevent the accurate fitting of the final crown. If a dentist cannot be seen in a timely manner, the temporary crown may be re-cemented by applying temporary cement to the temporary crown.

== Materials ==
A systemic study found that di-methacrylate-based provisional restorations had better flexural strength and hardness than the mono-methacrylate-based ones, while, within the mono-methacrylate group, poly-methylmethacrylate showed better flexural strength than poly-ethylmethacrylate.

== Oral hygiene ==
Oral hygiene tooth brushing and flossing is crucial to prevent gingival inflammation and bleeding. Patients are advised to pull the dental floss out buccally instead of pulling it back up through the contact point. This is to avoid accidentally pulling out a provisional restoration.
