= Smear layer =

Layer on root canal walls in dentistry

In dentistry, the smear layer is a layer found on root canal walls after root canal instrumentation. It consists of microcrystalline and organic particle debris. It was first described in 1975 and research has been performed since then to evaluate its importance in bacteria penetration into the dentinal tubules and its effects on endodontic treatment. More broadly, it is the organic layer found over all hard tooth surfaces.

== Description ==
Early studies of dentinal walls after cavity preparation performed by Brännström and Johnson (1974) showed the presence of a thin layer of debris that was 2 to 5 micrometres thick.

In 1975 McComb and Smith first described the smear layer. They observed an amorphous layer of debris, with an irregular and granular surface, on instrumented dentinal walls using a scanning electron microscope (SEM). The thin, granular microcrystalline layer of debris was 2–5 micrometres thick and was found packed onto the canal wall. The authors stated that "most standard instrumentation techniques produced a canal wall that was smeared and packed with debris."

In the same year Mader et al. studied the morphological characteristics of the smear layer in teeth that were endodontically instrumented with k type files and irrigated with 5.25% NaOCl. The smear layer was examined from two aspects; the first aspect looked "down onto" the smear layer and the second from the side. Photomicrographs obtained by SEM showed that the smear layer consists of two confluent components. These were described as a thin superficial layer 1–2 micrometres thick overlying a densely packed layer and a second that penetrated into the dentinal tubules for distances of up to 40 micrometres. The packed material showed finger like structures projecting into the tubules from the canal wall.

== Contents ==
=== Composition ===
In 1984 Pashely described the smear layer as being composed of two phases; an organic phase, composed of collagen residues and glycosaminoglycans from extracellular matrix of pulp cells, which acts as a matrix for an inorganic phase. This organo-mineral content is composed of two distinct superimposed layers. The first layer covers the canal wall and is loosely adherent and easy to remove. The second layer however occludes the dentinal tubules and strongly adheres to the canal walls.

==== Contents of the smear layer ====
- Dentine particles
- Residual vital pulp tissue
- Residual necrotic pulp tissue
- Erythrocytes
- Remnant of odontoblast process
- Saliva
- Bacterial components

=== Thickness of the smear layer ===
The smear layer is a physical barrier that decreases the penetration of disinfecting agents into dentinal tubules, and consequently, their efficacy. The most important cause of endodontic failure is the residual microorganisms that are harboured within the root canal system and hard-to-reach areas. Studies were conducted into the thickness of smear layer created by different instruments, to enhance the understanding and aid the removal of the smear layer, and therefore aid the removal of any bacteria that may otherwise have been entombed by the smear layer. Results of the study showed that the Protaper series of rotary instruments caused the maximum amount of smear layer, followed by the Profile series of rotary instruments. The hand instruments caused the least amount of smear layer. Increasing the roughness of instruments has been found to increase the thickness of the smear layer as well.

=== Bacterial Penetration ===
Olgart et al. (1974) examined the penetration of bacteria into dentinal tubules of ground, fractured and acid treated dentin surfaces. In vitro the penetration of bacteria into tubules of intact dentin exposed by fracture was compared in pairs of teeth, one of which in each pair was mounted with intrapulpal hydrostatic pressure (30 mmHg). In vivo, intra pair comparisons of bacterial invasion into dentinal tubules beneath ground, fractured and acid treated surfaces were made. They observed that an outward flow of fluids into the tubules due to intrapulpal pressure mechanically hindered bacterial growth and that the debris and smear layer produced from grinding obstructed the bacterial invasion into tubules. However this barrier seemed to be removed after a few days which allowed bacterial growth into intact dentin. Olgart came to a conclusion that acid produced by microorganisms may dissolve the smear layer allowing bacteria to pass into dentinal tubules.

However, when Pashley et al. (1981) studied the scanning electron microscope (SEM) appearance of dentin before and after removing successive layers of the smear layer they came to a different conclusion. Twenty dentin disks were cut from human extracted third molars. The dentin surface of the disks was etched with 6% citric acid for 5, 15, 30, 45 and 60 seconds. SEM examination showed that citric acid was able to remove smear layer in successive layers according to etching time finally exposing the dentinal tubules. Pashley concluded that the maintenance of the smear layer established a protective diffusion barrier.

Gettleman et al. (1991) assessed the influence of a smear layer on the adhesion of sealer cements to dentin. A total of 120 teeth was tested, 40 per sealer namely AH26, Sultan, and Sealapex; 20 each with and without the smear layer. The teeth were split longitudinally, and the internal surfaces were ground flat. In the smear layer-free specimens the smear layer was removed by washing for 3 minutes with 17% EDTA followed by 5.25% NaOCl. Using a specially designed jig, the sealer was placed into a 4-mm wide × 4-mm deep well which was then set onto the tooth at a 90-degree angle and allowed to set for 7 days. This set-up was then placed into a mounting jig which was designed for the Instron Universal Testing Machine so that only a tensile load was applied without shearing. The set-up was subjected to a tensile load at a crosshead speed of 1 mm per min. The only significant difference with regard to the presence or absence of the smear layer was found with AH26, which had a stronger bond when the smear layer was removed.

== Removal of the smear layer ==
=== Reasons for removal ===
The smear layer can affect bonding, disinfection as well as obturation hence why it is considered important to remove. As discussed earlier this is a result of the fact that bacteria can be left entombed within the smear layer, if not removed.

- Impaired bonding Removing the smear layer exposes the underlying bulk and the orifices of the dentine tubules which are occluded following mechanical tooth preparation. This allows interaction between the bulk dentine and restorative resin ensuring an effective bond and seal. Failure to remove the smear layer may compromise the bond strength and sealing ability as it may not be strongly bound to the underlying dentine.
- Impaired disinfection If the smear layer is not removed during dental procedures, the disinfection process will be compromised as the disinfectant is unable to penetrate the infected dentinal tubules. The presence of bacteria in dentinal tubules can reduce the outward flow of dentinal fluid, promoting disease and an increased diffusion rate of substrates into tubules. Disease promotion can lead to inflammatory changes in the pulpo-dentinal complex, leading to pulpitis, pulpal necrosis, infection of the root canal system and periapical disease. This can cause pain, and discomfort and further complications if left unchecked.
- Impaired obturation Following mechanical tooth preparation during endodontic procedures the smear layer can act as a barrier between filling materials and the root canal wall. This compromises the formation of a satisfactory seal, leading to possible coronal leakage. Bacteria left underneath a material can populate and allow the invasion of more bacteria into dentinal tubules infection and failure of treatment. Teeth prepared using GI sealant and lateral condensation of GP showed higher rates of leakage when smear layer was not removed.

=== Methods for removal ===
==== Endodontic irrigation ====
Because the smear layer produced during endodontic instrumentation contains both inorganic and organic material, it cannot be removed by any of the presently available root canal irrigants alone. Therefore, the recommended protocol for smear layer removal is NaOCl followed by EDTA (ethylenediaminetetraacetic acid) or citric acid. Water, saline, chlorhexidine (CHX), or iodine compounds have no dissolving effect on the smear layer.

- Sodium hypochlorite (NaOCl) The most widely used root canal irrigation solution for several decades because it is inexpensive, can dissolve infected necrotic tissue and is bactericidal. The antimicrobial effectiveness is due to its high pH. This interferes with the cytoplasmic membrane integrity with irreversible enzymatic inhibition, biosynthetic alterations in cellular metabolism and phospholipid degradation. When hypochlorite contacts proteins it causes amino acid degradation and hydrolysis through the action of chloramine molecules. Thus necrotic tissue and pus are dissolved. Both citric acid and EDTA immediately reduce the available chlorine in solution, rendering the sodium hypochlorite irrigant ineffective on bacteria and necrotic tissue. Hence, citric acid or EDTA should never be mixed with sodium hypochlorite.
- Ethylenediaminetetraacetic acid (EDTA) This is the most widely used chelating agent. Its prominence as a chelating agent arises from its ability to sequester di and triactionic metal ions such as Ca2+ and Fe3+. With direct exposure for extended time EDTA extracts bacterial surface proteins by combining with metal ions from the cell envelope, which can eventually lead to bacterial death. Effect of phosphoric acid etching and self-etching primer application methods on dentinal shear bond strength. Testing and clinical evidence has shown that 17% EDTA needs to be placed inside the root canal for one minute to effectively dissolve organic components and smear layer. If the EDTA is placed within the root canal for less than one minute, the smear layer will not optimally be removed. The recommended time for smear layer removal is two minutes. EDTA alone cannot remove the smear layer completely. The inorganic portion is removed but the organic matter is still left partially blocking the dentin canal openings. EDTA effectively abolishes the tissue‐dissolving effect of NaOCl and should therefore not be used until at the end of the treatment as the final rinse.
- Citric acid 10% citric acid can be used as an alternative to EDTA as the final rinse to remove the smear layer after use of NaOCL. Citric acid is more potent than EDTA. Citric acid is used as a component in MTAD and Tetraclean, the combination products for smear layer removal. In the MTAD preparation citric acid helps remove the smear layer by allowing the doxycycline to enter the dentinal tubules and exert an antibacterial effect.

Paste lubricants

Gel based lubricants can be placed on the instrument before insertion into the root canal to reduce friction. Examples include "Glyde" and "Fileze" which both contain the chelating agent EDTA which can help enlarge narrow root canals by softening the canal walls.

Dentine conditioners

These are generally acidic solutions which dissolve or at least solubilize the smear layer in attempt to expose the underlying dentine to the bonding agent. Examples include: phosphoric acid, nitric acid, maleic acid, citric acid, EDTA. Most manufacturers now supply a single agent to simultaneously etch enamel and condition the dentine.

- Three step dentine bonding agents Three separate solutions, etch, prime and bond are applied to the tooth surface. Examples of such include Optibond, Adper Scotchbond MP, It is important to rinse tooth after application of the etch to ensure remove the smear layer. If there is no rinsing stage post conditioning, there can be re-deposition on the dentine surface. Following this the dentine is now ready to be treated with the primer and dentine bonding agent. Manufacturers have attempted to simplify this process by producing a variety of products to combine these stages.
- Two step dentine bonding agents It is possible for the dentine conditioner and primer to be applied in one stage often referred to as a "self-etching primer" examples: Clearfil SE Bond. The primer used is acidic which dissolves the smear layer whilst also providing the functions of a primer. "Self-etching primers" should not be washed off as this would remove the primer and interfere with the bonding process. The smear layer is incorporated within the primer which has direct contact with bulk dentine. Two stage systems where the prime and bond steps are combined and the etch is applied separately also exist – examples include Prime & Bond NT, Optibond Solo.
- One step dentine bonding agents Some manufacturers have produced products able to condition, prime and bond in one application. Such systems include Fuji bond, Scotchbond Universal, Xeno III. It has been argued that self-etching systems may not be as effective as a phosphoric acid at etching enamel alone.

== Further research ==
Clark-Holke et al. (2003) focused on determining the effect of the smear layer on the magnitude of bacterial penetration through the apical foramen around obturating materials. Thirty extracted teeth were classified into two test groups; the first group had the smear layer removed by rinsing with 17% EDTA while in the second group the smear layer was left intact. Canal preparation and obturation using lateral condensation, gutta-percha, and AH 26 sealer was performed on all of the teeth. The model systems consisted of an upper chamber attached to the cemento-enamel junction and a lower chamber at the apices of the teeth. Standardized bacterial suspensions containing Fusobacterium nucleatum, Campylobacter rectus and Peptostreptococcus micros were inoculated into the upper chambers. Models were incubated anaerobically at 37 °C. Leakage results were as follows: In the first group 6 teeth showed bacterial leakage, the second group and third groups showed no bacterial leakage. This study indicated that removal of the smear layer reduced the leakage of bacteria through the root canal system.

Kokkas et al. (2004) examined the effect of the smear layer on the penetration depth of three different sealers (AH Plus, Apexit, and a Grossman type-Roth 811) into the dentinal tubules. Sixty four extracted human single-rooted teeth were used and divided into two groups. The smear layer remained intact in all the roots of group A. Complete removal of the smear layer in group B was achieved after irrigation with 3 ml of 17% EDTA for 3 min, followed by 3 ml of 1% NaOCl solution. Ten roots from each group were obturated with AH Plus and laterally condensed gutta-percha points. The same process was repeated for the remaining roots by using sealers Apexit and Roth 811 correspondingly. After complete setting, the maximum penetration depth of the sealers into the dentinal tubules was examined in upper, middle, and lower levels. The smear layer prevented all the sealers from penetrating dentinal tubules. In contrast, in smear layer–free root canals, all the sealers penetrated dentinal tubules, although the depth of penetration varied between the sealers. Furthermore, smear layer adversely affected the coronal and apical sealing ability of sealers.

Çobankara et al. (2004) determined the effect of the smear layer on apical and coronal leakage in root canals obturated with AH26 or RoekoSeal sealers. A total of 160 maxillary anterior teeth were used. Eight groups were created by all possible combinations of three factors: smear layer (present/absent), leakage assessment (apical/coronal), and sealer used (AH26/Roeko-Seal). All teeth were obturated using lateral condensation technique of gutta-percha. A fluid filtration method was used to test apical or coronal leakage. According to the results of this study, the smear (+) groups displayed higher apical and coronal leakage than those smear (-) groups for both root canal sealers. Apical leakage was significantly higher than coronal leakage for both root canal sealers used in this study. It was determined that that removal of the smear layer has a positive effect in reducing apical and coronal leakage for both AH26 and RoekoSeal root canal sealers.

However Bertacci et al. (2007) evaluated the ability of a warm gutta-percha obturation system Thermafil to fill lateral channels in the presence or absence of the smear layer. Forty single-rooted extracted human teeth were randomly divided into two groups one of which had the smear layer removed by 5 ml of 5% NaOCl followed by 2.5 ml of 17% EDTA. Obturation was performed using AH Plus sealer and Thermafil. Specimens were cleared in methyl salicylate and analyzed under a stereomicroscope to evaluate the number, length, and diameter of lateral channels. All lateral channels were found to be filled in both groups. No statistically significant differences regarding number, length, and diameter were observed between the two groups. It was concluded that the smear layer did not prevent the sealing of lateral channels.

Yildirim et al. (2008) investigated the effect of the smear layer on apical microleakage in teeth obturated with MTA. Fifty single-rooted central maxillary teeth were used in this study. The selected teeth were instrumented and randomly divided into 2 groups. In the first group (smear [+]), the teeth were irrigated with only 5.25% NaOCl. In the second group (smear [-]), the teeth were irrigated with EDTA (17%) and NaOCl (5.25%) to remove the smear layer. The teeth were then filled with MTA. The computerized fluid filtration method was used for evaluation of apical microleakage. The quantitative apical leakage of each tooth was measured after 2, 30, and 180 days. It was found that there was no difference between the groups after 2 days but removal of the smear layer caused significantly more apical microleakage than when the smear layer was left intact after 30 and 180 days. It was concluded that the apical microleakage of MTA is less when the smear layer is present than when it is absent.

Saleh et al. (2008) studied the effect of the smear layer on the penetration of bacteria along different root canal filling materials. A total of 110 human root segments were instrumented to size 80 under irrigation with 1% sodium hypochlorite. Half of the roots were irrigated with a 5-mL rinse of 17% EDTA to remove the smear layer. Roots were filled with gutta-percha (GP) and AH Plus sealer (AH), GP and Apexit sealer (AP), or RealSeal cones and sealer (RS). Following storage in humid conditions at 37 °C for 7 days, the specimens were mounted into a bacterial leakage test model for 135 days. Survival analyses were performed to calculate the median time of leakage and log-rank test was used for pairwise comparisons of groups. Selected specimens were longitudinally sectioned and inspected by scanning electron microscopy for the presence of bacteria at the interfaces. In the presence of the smear layer, RS and AP leaked significantly more slowly than in its absence. In the absence of the smear layer, AH leaked significantly more slowly than RS. It was concluded that removal of the smear layer did not impair bacterial penetration along root canal fillings. A comparison of the sealers revealed no difference except that AH performed better than RS in the absence of the smear layer.

Fachin et al.(2009) evaluated whether smear layer removal has any influence on the filling of the root canal system, by examining the obturation of lateral canals, secondary canals and apical deltas. Eighty canines were randomly divided into two groups, according to their irrigation regimen. Both groups were irrigated with 1% NaOCl during canal shaping, but only the teeth in Group II received a final irrigation with 17% EDTA for smear layer removal. The root canals were obturated with lateral condensation of gutta-percha and the specimens were cleared, allowing for observation under the microscope. The results showed that In Groups I and II, 42.5% and 37.5% of the teeth, respectively, presented at least one filled canal ramification. In conclusion, smear layer removal under the conditions tested in this study did not affect the obturation of root canal ramifications when lateral condensation of gutta-percha was the technique used for root canal filling.
