= Kuraray =

Japanese manufacturer

Kuraray Co., Ltd. 株式会社クラレ
- Company type: Public (K.K)
- Traded as: TYO: 3405; Nikkei 225 Component
- Industry: Chemicals
- Founded: Kurashiki, Okayama, Japan (June 24, 1926; 99 years ago)
- Founder: Magosaburō Ōhara; Torajiro Kojima
- Headquarters: Ote Center Building,1-1-3, Ōtemachi, Chiyoda-ku, Tokyo 100-8115, Japan (Tokyo head office); Umeda Hankyu Building Office Tower, 8-1, Kakudacho, Kita-ku, Osaka 530-8611, Japan (Osaka head office)
- Key people: Hitoshi Kawahara (President and CEO)
- Products: Chemicals; Resins; Fibers; Textiles; High performance materials; Dental materials
- Operating income: ¥44.3 billion (2020)
- Net income: ¥2.6 billion (2020)
- Number of employees: 11,219 (consolidated as of December 31, 2020)
- Subsidiaries: Calgon Carbon Corporation Chemviron MonoSol, LLC
- Website: Official website

Kuraray Co., Ltd (株式会社クラレ, Kabushiki-gaisha Kurare) is a Japanese manufacturer of chemicals, fibers and other materials. Their main manufacturing facilities are located in Kurashiki, Okayama. The company's Tokyo administrative offices are located in Otemachi, Chiyoda in the Ote Center Building and its Osaka offices are located in the Umeda Hankyu Building). As of June 2007, Kuraray was the sole worldwide producer of Vectran liquid crystal polymer (LCP) fibre.

The company is listed in the first section of Tokyo Stock Exchange and is a member of the Nikkei 225 stock market index.

Kuraray is a member of the Mizuho keiretsu.

== History ==
In April 2015, Kuraray acquired the Australian manufacturer of biobased barrier films Plantic Technologies. In September 2017, Kuraray acquired Calgon Carbon for $1.1 billion, an activated carbon maker based in Pittsburgh. In February 2021, Kuraray signed the global framework of the United Nations Global Compact.

== Product Offerings ==
Various products are described below:

- Clarino
- EVAL
- Felibendy (nonwoven fabric of Sophista composite fiber, see below)
- Genestar
- MOWIOL
- MOWIFLEX
- MOWITAL / PIOLOFORM
- KURARAY POVAL
- Septon
- Sophista (fiber: polyester core, ethylene vinyl alcohol-coated)
- Vectran
- Butacite® / TROSIFOL brand polyvinyl butyral

== Gallery ==
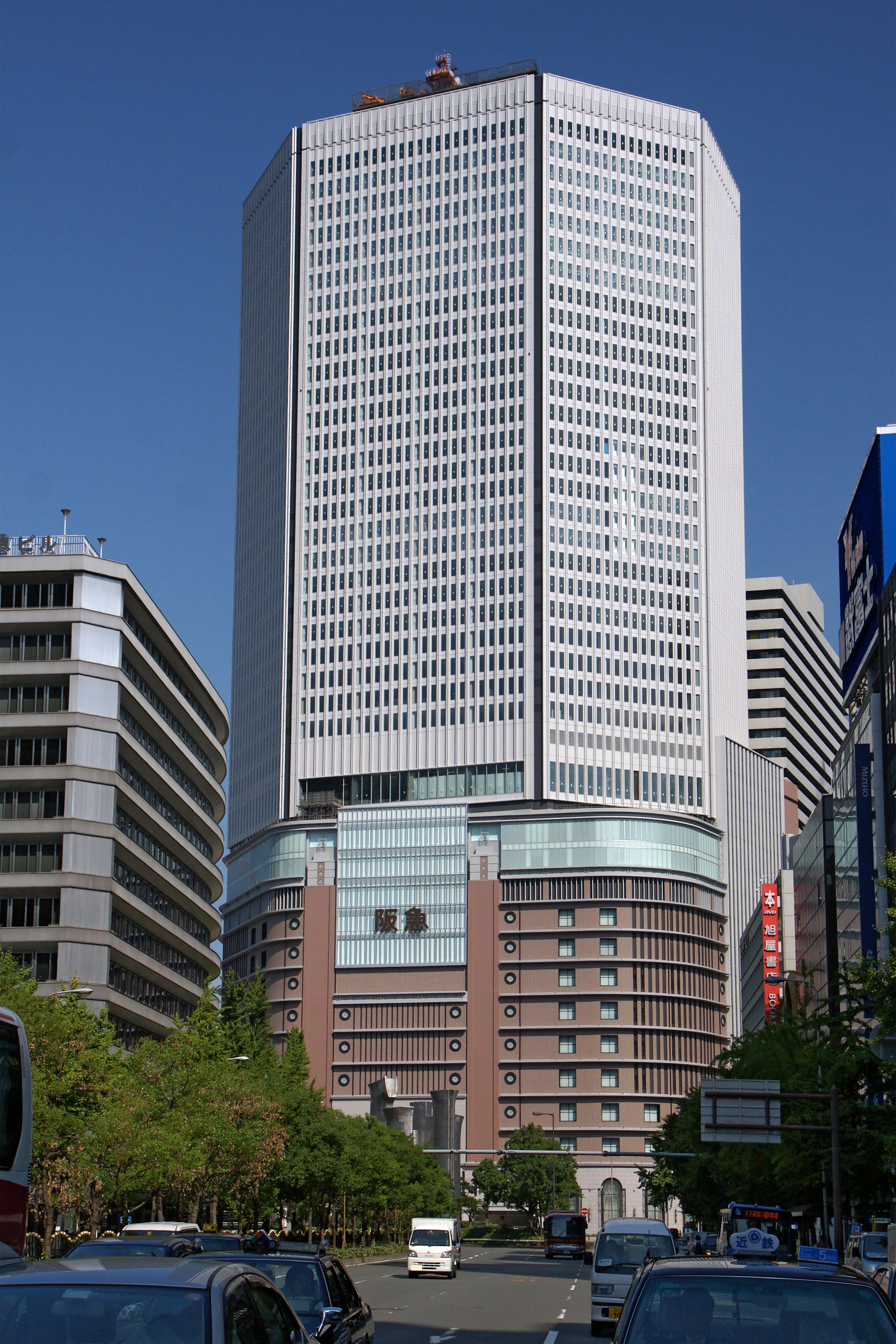
Kuraray's Osaka head office in the Umeda Hankyu Building Office Tower

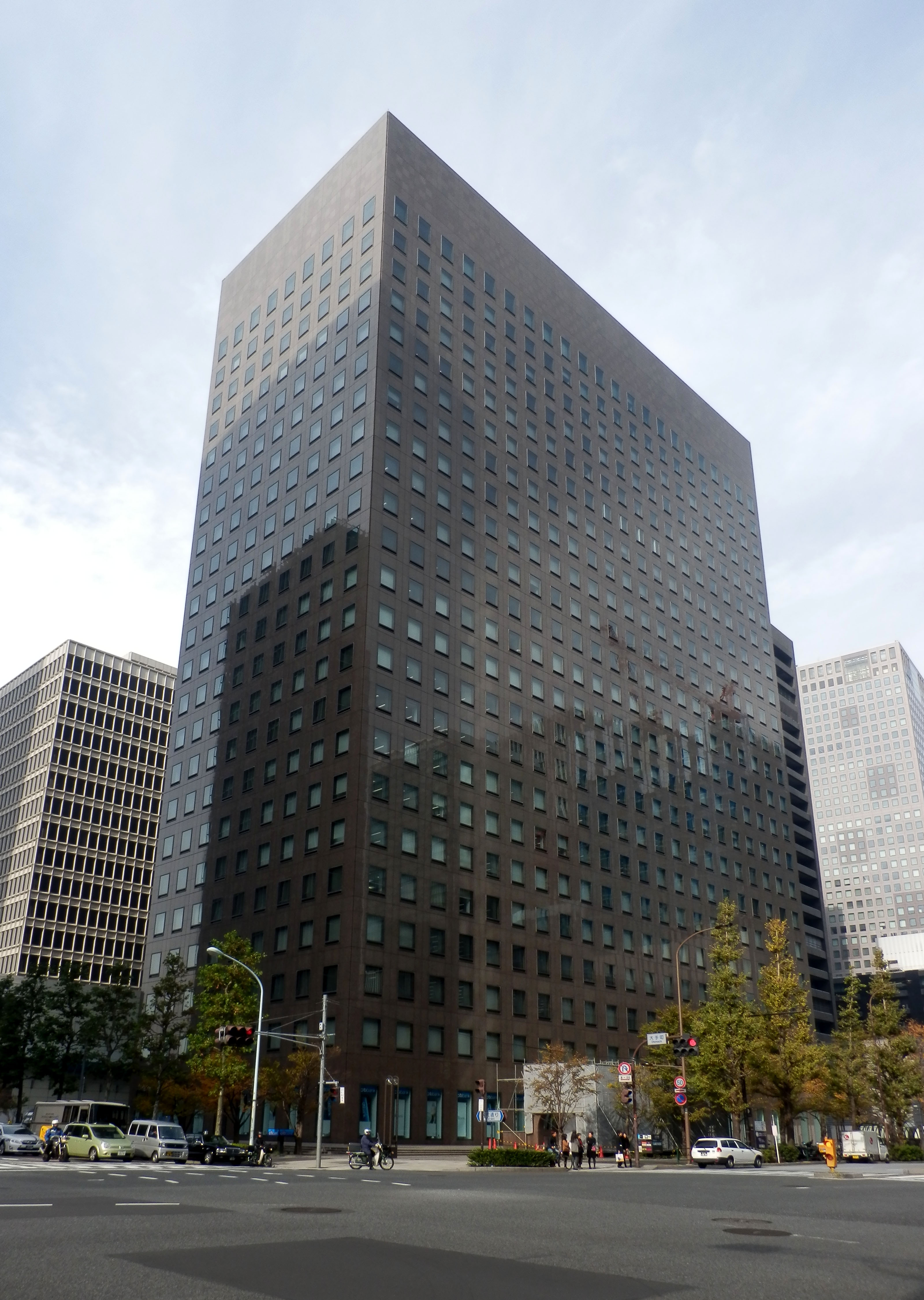
The company's Tokyo head office in the Ote Center Building

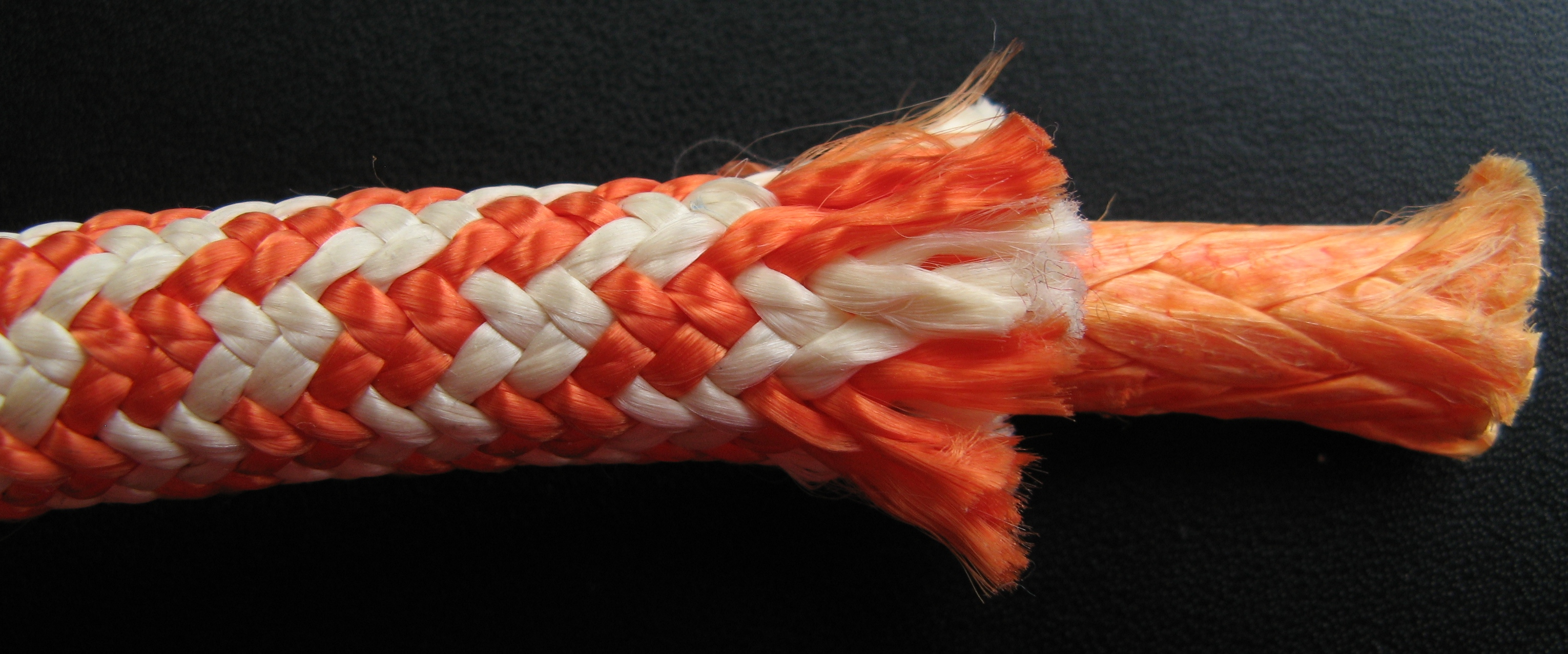
High performance rope with cover made from Vectran

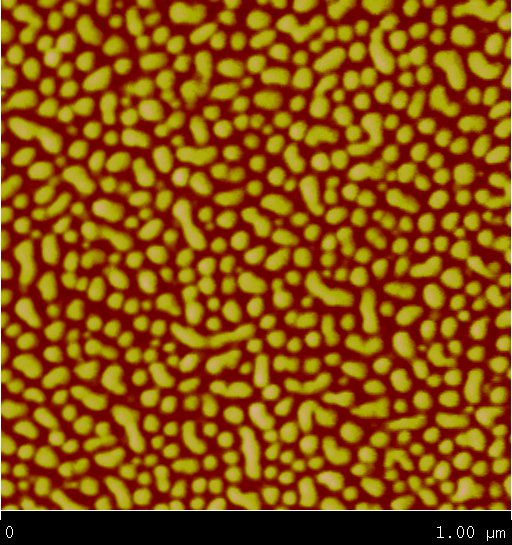
Kuraray's Septon 4055 under atomic force microscope

== Incidents ==
In May 2018, an explosion occurred in Kuraray's Pasadena plant in the US, injuring 21 workers. The plant is the world's largest ethylene vinyl alcohol plant. Kuraray agreed to pay a total of $92 million in settlement to the affected employees. In September 2019, a plasticizer leaked from Kuraray's plant in Fayetteville to the Cape Fear River, forcing the Brunswick County to stop drawing water from the river.
