= Dental bonding =

Adhesion or bonding to enamel or dentin of teeth

- MeSH: D001840

Adhesive dentistry is a branch of dentistry which deals with adhesion or bonding to the natural substance of teeth, enamel and dentin. It studies the nature and strength of adhesion to dental hard tissues, properties of adhesive materials, causes and mechanisms of failure of the bonds, clinical techniques for bonding and newer applications for bonding such as bonding to the soft tissue. There is also direct composite bonding which uses tooth-colored direct dental composites to repair various tooth damages such as cracks or gaps.

Dental bonding is a dental procedure in which a dentist applies a tooth-colored resin material (a durable plastic material) and cures it with visible, blue light. This ultimately "bonds" the material to the tooth and improves the overall appearance of teeth. Tooth bonding techniques have various clinical applications including operative dentistry and preventive dentistry as well as cosmetic and pediatric dentistry, prosthodontics, and orthodontics.

== History ==
Adhesive dentistry began in 1955 with a paper by Dr. Michael Buonocore on the benefits of acid etching. Technologies have changed multiple times since then, with generally recognized generations established in the literature. Dental bonding agents have evolved from no-etch to total-etch (4th- and 5th-generation) to self-etch (6th- and 7th-generation) systems. improved convenience and reduced sensitivity to operator errors. However, the best bonding and longevity was achieved with 4th generation agents (having separate etch, prime, and bond steps).

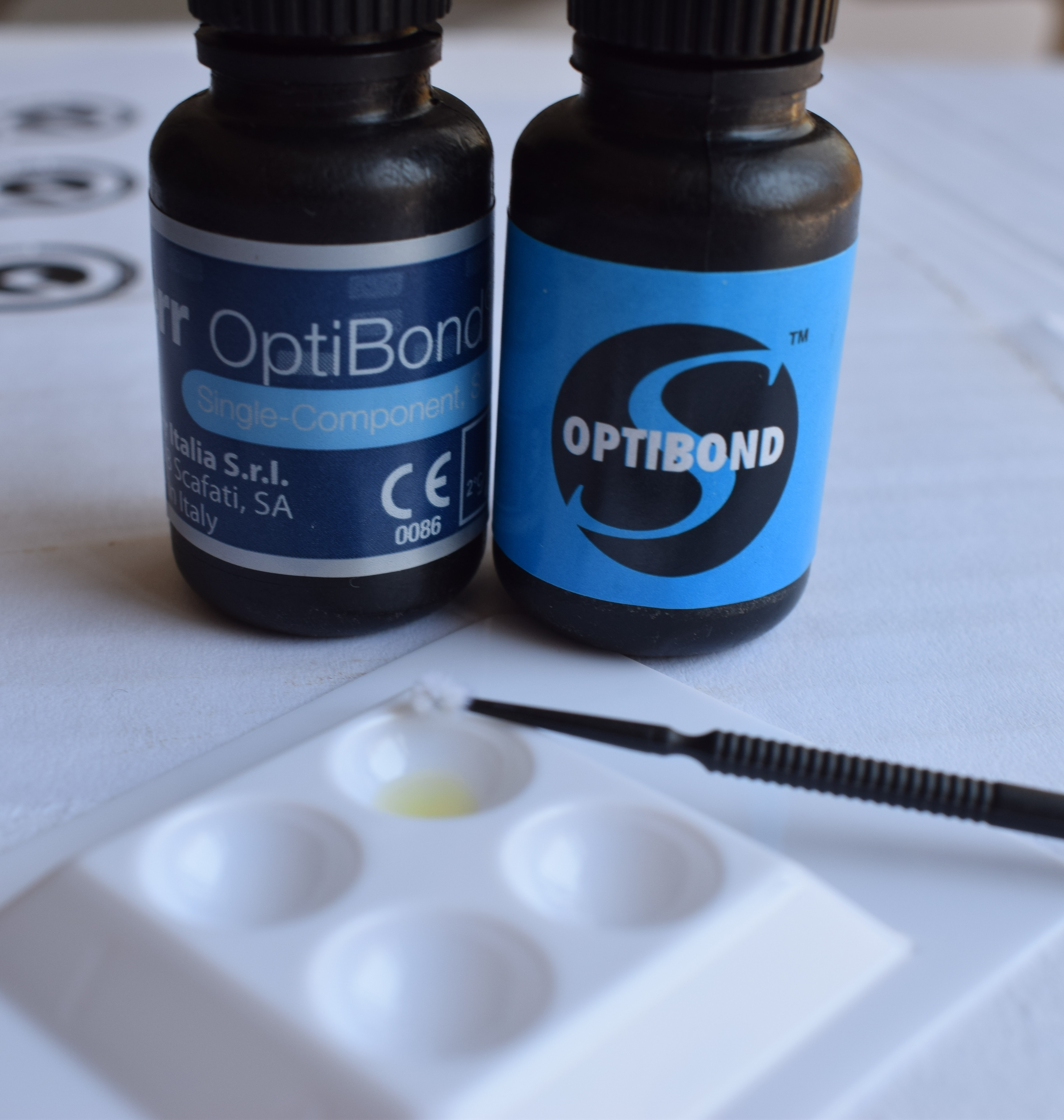
All in one self-etch adhesive and a single component universal adhesive by Kerr, both used in the adhesion of direct and indirect dental restorations

Irwin Smigel founder and current president of the American Society for Dental Aesthetics and diplomate of the American Board of Aesthetic Dentistry, was one of the first to broaden the usage of bonding by using it to close gaps between teeth, lengthen teeth as well as to re-contour the entire mouth rather than using crowns. Having done more extensive work on the process than any other dentist, Dr. Smigel lectures worldwide on aesthetic dentistry. In 1979 he published a guide to aesthetic dentistry entitled "Dental Health/Dental Beauty."

In 2012, new dental universal adhesives are commercialized. The universal adhesives bond to all dental substrates, which include enamel, dentin, metal, porcelain, ceramic and zirconia, with a single application. The term "universal" adhesive is not new. In fact, many early bonding agents were named or described as "universal" adhesives, such as XP Bond-Universal Total-etch Adhesive (Dentsply), One-Step-Universal Dental Adhesive (Bisco). However, there is still not a definition of dental "universal adhesive". It is highly confusing what the term "universal" means. In 2012, the term "universal adhesive" has several definitions which may include:

1. a) Can be used in total-etch, self-etch, and selective etch techniques;
2. b) Can be used with light-cure, self-cure, and dual-cure materials (without the separate activators);
3. c) Can be used for both direct and indirect substrates;
4. d) Can bond to all dental substrates, such as dentin, enamel, metal, ceramic, porcelain, and zirconia.

== In orthodontic treatments ==
Bonding of orthodontic brackets to teeth is crucial to enable effective treatment with fixed appliances. There is no clear evidence on which to make a clinical decision of the type of orthodontic adhesive to use.

== Dental adhesive ==
- Dentine bonding agents

== See also ==
- Fixed prosthodontics
- Cosmetic dentistry
