= Dental material =

Specially fabricated substances designed for use in dentistry

Dental products are specially fabricated materials, designed for use in dentistry. There are many different types of dental products, and their characteristics vary according to their intended purpose.

== Temporary dressings ==
A temporary dressing is a dental filling which is not intended to last in the long term. They are interim materials which may have therapeutic properties. A common use of temporary dressing occurs if root canal therapy is carried out over more than one appointment. In between each visit, the pulp canal system must be protected from contamination from the oral cavity, and a temporary filling is placed in the access cavity. Examples include:

- Zinc oxide eugenol—bactericidal, cheap and easy to remove. Eugenol is derived from oil of cloves, and has an obtundant effect on the tooth and decreases toothache. It is suitable temporary material providing there are no biting forces on it. It is also contraindicated if the final restorative material is composite because eugenol adversely effects the bond/polymerization process; also, when applied directly on the pulp tissue, it can produce chronic inflammation and result in pulp necrosis. Brands include Kalzinol and Sedanol.

== Cements ==
Dental cements are used most often to bond indirect restorations such as crowns to the natural tooth surface. Examples include:

- Zinc oxide cement—self setting and hardens when in contact with saliva. Example brands: Cavit, Coltosol.
- Zinc phosphate cement
- Zinc polycarboxylate cement—adheres to enamel and dentin. Example brand: PolyF.
- Glass ionomer cement
- Resin-based cement
- Copper-based cement

== Impression materials ==
Dental impressions are negative imprints of teeth and oral soft tissues from which a positive representation can be cast. They are used in prosthodontics (to make dentures), orthodontics, restorative dentistry, dental implantology and oral and maxillofacial surgery.

Because patients' soft-tissue undercuts may be shallow or deep, impression materials vary in their rigidity in order to obtain an accurate impression. Rigid materials are used with patients with shallow undercuts, while elastic materials are used with patients with deep undercuts, as the material must be flexible enough to reach the end-point of the undercut.

Impression materials are designed to be liquid or semi-solid when first mixed, then set hard in a few minutes, leaving imprints of oral structures.

Common dental impression materials include sodium alginate, polyether and silicones. Historically, plaster of Paris, zinc oxide eugenol and agar were used.

== Lining materials ==
Dental lining materials are used during restorations of large cavities, and are placed between the remaining tooth structure and the restoration material. The purpose of this is to protect the dentinal tubules and the sensitive pulp, forming a barrier-like structure. After drilling the caries out of the tooth, the dentist applies a thin layer (approximately 1/2mm) to the base of the tooth, followed by light curing. Another layer might be applied if the cavity is very large and deep.

There are many functions to dental lining materials, some of which are listed below:

- Lining materials protect the weak tooth from post-operative hypersensitivity, reducing patient discomfort and allowing the tooth to heal at a faster rate after the procedure.
- Some dental restorative materials, such as acrylic monomers in resin-based materials and phosphoric acid in silicate materials, may pose toxic and irritable effects to the pulp. Lining materials protect the tooth from such irritants.
- Lining materials serve as an insulating layer to the tooth pulp from sudden changes in temperature when the patient takes hot or cold food, protecting them from potential pain resulting from thermal conductivity.
- Lining materials are electrically insulating, preventing corrosion by galvanic cell where two dissimilar metals (e.g. gold or amalgam) are placed next to each other.

=== Types ===
Calcium hydroxide

Calcium hydroxide is a relatively low compressive strength and a viscous consistency, making it difficult to apply to cavities in thick sections. A common technique to overcome this issue is to apply a thin sub-lining of calcium hydroxide, then build up with zinc phosphate prior to amalgam condensation. This generates a relatively high pH environment around the area surrounding the cement due to calcium hydroxide leaking out, thus making it bactericidal.

It also has a unique effect of initiating calcification and stimulating the formation of secondary dentine, due to an irritation effect of the pulp tissues by the cement.

Calcium hydroxide is radio-opaque and acts as a good thermal and electrical insulation. However, due to its low compressive strength it is unable to withstand amalgam packing; a strong cement base material should be placed above it to counter this.

Calcium silicate-based liners have become alternatives to calcium hydroxide and are preferred by practitioners for their bioactive and sealing properties; the material triggers a biological response and results in formation of bonding with the tissue. They are commonly used as pulp capping agents and lining materials for silicate and resin-based filling materials.

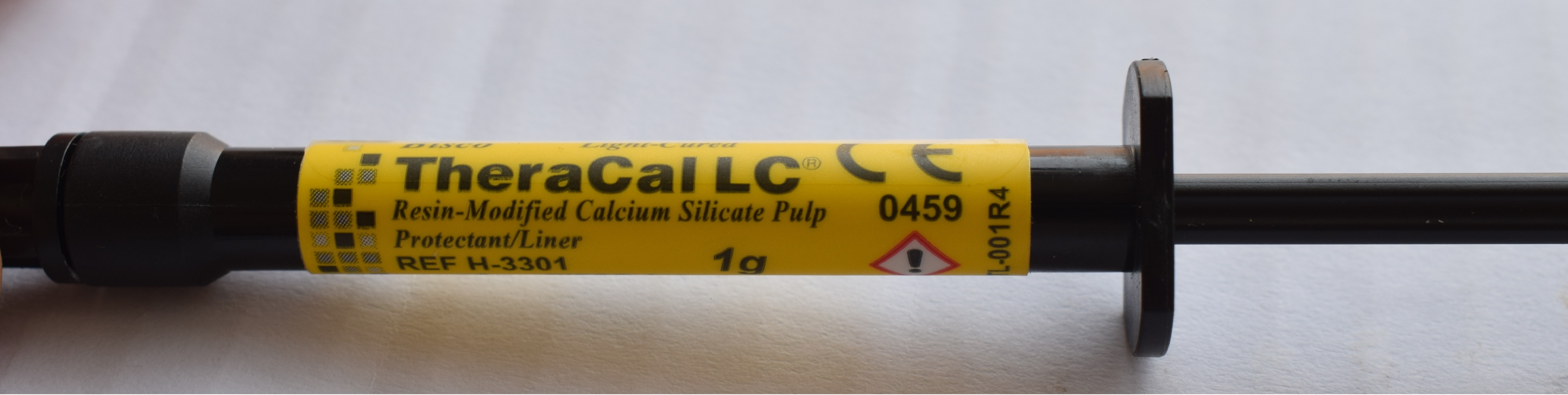
Calcium-silicate liner used as a pulp capping material

It is usually supplied as two pastes, a glycol salicylate and another paste containing zinc oxide with calcium hydroxide. On mixing, a chelate compound is formed. Light-activated versions are also available; these contain polymerization activators, hydroxyethyl methacrylate, dimethacrylate which when light activated will result in a polymerization reaction of a modified methacrylate monomer.

Polycarboxylate cement

Polycarboxylate cement has the compressive strength to resist amalgam condensation. It is acidic, but less acidic than phosphate cements due to it having a higher molecular weight and polyacrylic acid being weaker than phosphoric acid. It forms a strong bond with dentine and enamel, allowing it to form a coronal seal. In addition, it is an electrical and thermal insulator while also releasing fluoride, rendering it bacteriostatic. It is also radio-opaque, making it an excellent lining material.

Care has to be taken in handling such material, as it has a strong bond with stainless steel instruments once it sets.

Polycarboxylate cement is commonly used as a luting agents or as a cavity base material. However, it tends to be rubbery during its setting reaction and adheres to stainless steel instruments, so most operators prefer not to use it in deep cavities.

It is usually supplied as a power containing zinc oxide and a liquid containing aqueous polyacrylic acid. The reaction consists of an acid base reaction with zinc oxide reacting with the acid groups in polyacid. This forms a reaction product of unreacted zinc oxide cores bound by a salt matrix, with polyacrylic acid chains cross linking with zinc ions.

Glass ionomer

Glass ionomer (GI) has the strongest compressive and tensile strength of all linings, so it can withstand amalgam condensation in high stress bearing areas such as class II cavities. GI is used as a lining material as it is very compatible with most restorative materials, insulates thermally and electrically, and adheres to enamel and dentine. GI lining contains glass of smaller particle sizes compared to its adhesive restorative mix, to allow formation of a thinner film. Some variations are also radiopaque, making them good for X-ray cavity detection. In addition, GI is bacteriostatic due to its fluoride release from un-reacted glass cores.

GIs are usually used as a lining material for composite resins or as luting agents for orthodontic bands.

The reaction is an acid-base reaction between calcium-aluminum-silicate glass powder and polyacrylic acid. They come in a powder and liquid which are mixed on a pad or in capsules which are for single usage. Resin-modified GIs contain a photoinitiator (usually camphorquinone) and an amide, and are light cured with a LED light curing unit. Setting takes place by a combination of acid-base reaction and chemically activated polymerization.

Zinc oxide eugenol

Zinc oxide eugenol has the lowest compressive and tensile strength of the liners, so its use is limited to small or non-stress-bearing areas such as Class V cavities. This cavity lining is often used with a high strength base to provide strength, rigidity and thermal insulation. Zinc oxide eugenol can be used as linings in deep cavities without causing harm to the pulp, due to its obtundant effect on the pulp as well as its bactericidal properties due to zinc. However, eugenol may have an effect on resin-based filling materials, as it interferes with polymerization and occasionally causes discoloration. Caution could therefore be exercised when using both in tandem. It is also radio-opaque, allowing fillings to be visible by X-rays.

Zinc oxide eugenol is usually used as a temporary filling/luting agent due to its low compressive strength making it easily removed, or as a lining for amalgam as it is incompatible with composites resins.

It is supplied as a two paste system. Equal length of two pastes are dispensed into a paper pad and mixed.

| Agent | Advantages | Disadvantages |
| Calcium hydroxide | Alkaline nature promotes anti-bacterial atmosphere; Therapeutic effect for dentinal tubules; Low thermal conductivity can provide thermal insulation; Radiopaque; Thermal and electrical insulator; Good restorative material compatibility | Soluble for oral fluids thus restricted to dentine coverage only; Viscous consistency makes it difficult to apply to cavities in thick sections; Low compressive strength, requiring a second layer of strong cement base above it |
| Polycarboxylate cement | Decent compressive and tensile strength; Radiopaque; Bacteriostatic due to fluoride release; Adhesive thus coronal seal; Compatible with most restorative materials; Thermal and electrical insulator | Mildly acidic thus a mild irritant; Hard to handle due to strong bond with stainless steel instruments; Rubbery during setting reaction thus hard to manipulate in deep cavities |
| Zinc oxide eugenol | Can be used as a temporary filling or lining as it is easy to remove even after set; Bactericidal due to zinc; Thermal and electrical insulator; Radiopaque due to zinc; Obtundant | Lowest compressive and tensile strength of all linings; can only be used on areas with little or no stress; Incompatible with resin composites due to polymerization interference; Non adhesive thus no coronal seal |
| Glass ionomer | Relatively high compressive and tensile strength; Radiopaque; Very adhesive to enamel and dentine thus don't need a bonding agent; Bacteriosatic due to fluoride release; Adhesive thus coronal seal; Good compatibility with restorative materials; Thermal and electrical insulator | Mildly acidic thus a mild irritant; Remains acidic for some time after mixing; Not an obtundant |

== Restorative materials ==
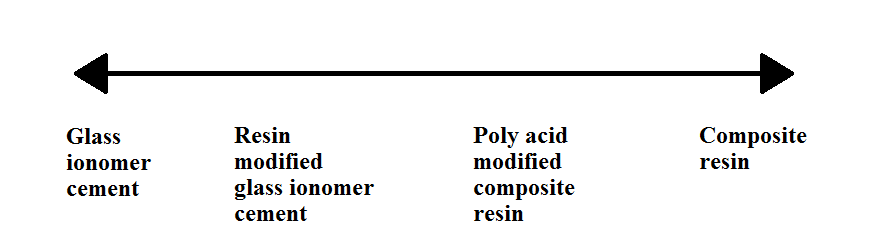
Glass ionomer cement - composite resin spectrum of restorative materials used in dentistry. Towards the GIC end of the spectrum, there is increasing fluoride release and increasing acid-base content; towards the composite resin end of the spectrum, there is increasing light cure percentage and increased flexural strength.

Dental restorative materials are used to replace tooth structure loss, usually due to dental caries (cavities), but also tooth wear and dental trauma. On other occasions, such materials may be used for cosmetic purposes to alter the appearance of an individual's teeth.

There are many challenges for the physical properties of the ideal dental restorative material. The ideal material would be identical to natural tooth structure in strength, adherence, and appearance. The properties of such material can be divided into four categories: physical properties, biocompatibility, aesthetics and application.

- Physical properties of good restorative materials include low thermal conductivity and expansion, resistance to different categories of forces and wear such as attrition and abrasion, and resistance to chemical erosion. There must also be good bonding strength to the tooth. Everyday masticatory forces and conditions must be withstood without material fatigue.
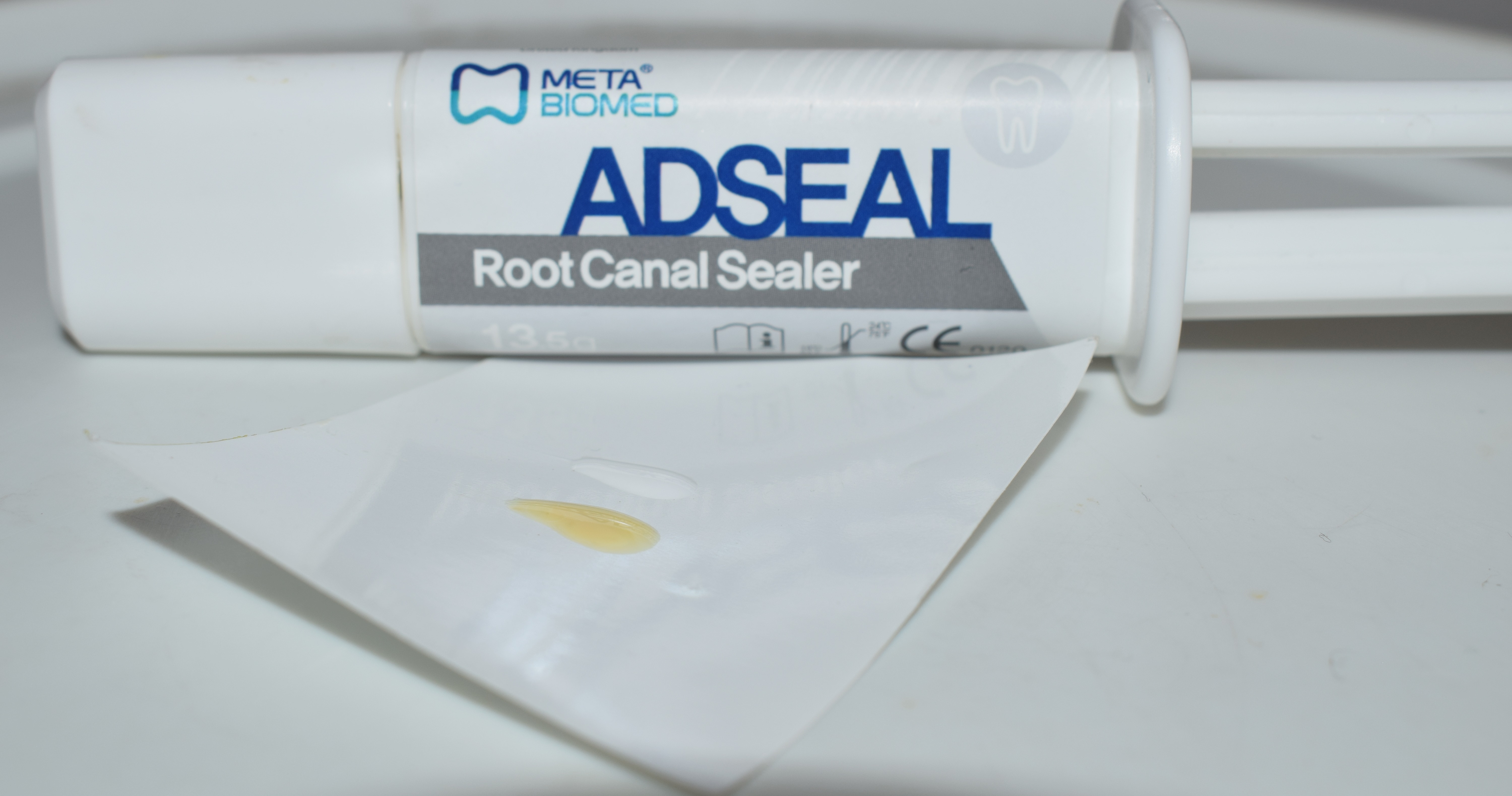
- Root canal sealer used in endodontic therapy
  Biocompatibility refers to how well the material coexists with the biological equilibrium of the tooth and body systems. Since fillings are in close contact with mucosa, tooth, and pulp, biocompatibility is very important. Common problems with some of the current dental materials include chemical leakage from the material, pulpal irritation and, less commonly, allergic reactions. Some of the byproducts of the chemical reactions during different stages of material hardening need to be considered.
- Radiopacity in dental materials is an important property that allows for distinguishing restorations from teeth and surrounding structures, assessing the absorption of materials into bone structure, and detecting cement dissolution or other failures that could cause harm to the patient. Cements, composites, endodontic sealers, bone grafts, and acrylic resins all benefit from the addition of radiopaque materials. Examples of these materials include zinc oxide, zirconium dioxide, titanium dioxide, barium sulfate, and ytterbium(III) fluoride.
- Ideally, filling materials should match the surrounding tooth structure in shade, translucency, and texture.
- Dental operators require materials that are easy to manipulate and shape, where the chemistry of any reactions that need to occur are predictable or controllable.

=== Direct restorative materials ===
Direct restorations are ones which are placed directly into a cavity on a tooth, and shaped to fit. The chemistry of the setting reaction for direct restorative materials is designed to be more biologically compatible. Heat and byproducts generated cannot damage the tooth or patient, since the reaction needs to take place while in contact with the tooth during restoration. This ultimately limits the strength of the materials, since harder materials need more energy to manipulate. The type of filling material used has a minor effect on how long they last. The majority of clinical studies indicate the annual failure rates (AFRs) are between 1% and 3% with tooth colored fillings on back teeth. Root canaled (endodontically) treated teeth have AFRs between 2% and 12%. The main reasons for failure are cavities that occur around the filling and fracture of the real tooth. These are related to personal cavity risk and factors like grinding teeth (bruxism).

==== Amalgam ====
Amalgam is a metallic filling material composed from a mixture of mercury (from 43% to 54%) and a powdered alloy made mostly of silver, tin, zinc and copper, commonly called the amalgam alloy. Amalgam does not adhere to tooth structure without the aid of cements or use of techniques which lock in the filling, using the same principles as a dovetail joint.

Amalgam is still used extensively in many parts of the world because of its cost effectiveness, superior strength and longevity. However, the metallic colour is not aesthetically pleasing and tooth-coloured alternatives with increasingly comparable properties have been developed. Due to the known toxicity of mercury, there is some controversy about the use of amalgams. The Swedish government banned the use of mercury amalgam in June 2009. Research has shown that while amalgam may increase mercury levels in the human body, these levels are below safety threshold levels established by the World Health Organization and the U.S. Environmental Protection Agency. However, there exist subpopulations whose members, because of inherited genetic variabilities, are more sensitive to mercury than these threshold levels. They may experience adverse effects caused by amalgam restoration, including neural defects caused by impaired neurotransmitter processing.

==== Composite resin ====
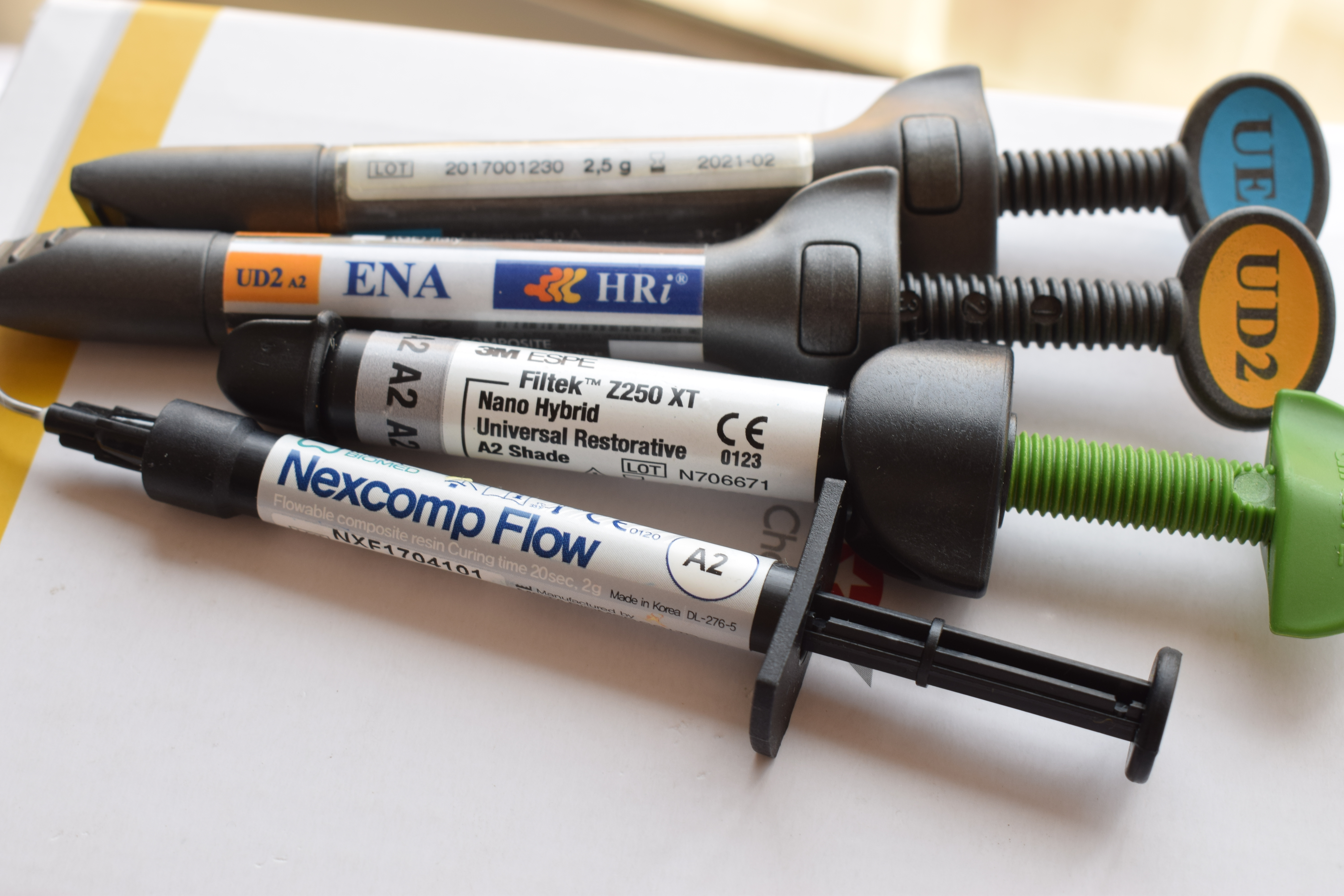
Enamel and dentin shades of composite. Other A2 universal shade for direct and indirect restorations, and flowable composite.

Composite resin fillings (also called white fillings) are a mixture of nanoparticles or powdered glass and plastic resin, and can be made to resemble the appearance of the natural tooth. Although cosmetically superior to amalgam fillings, composite resin fillings are usually more expensive. Bis-GMA based resins contain Bisphenol A, a known endocrine disrupter chemical, and may contribute to the development of breast cancer. However, there is no added risk of kidney or endocrine injury in choosing composite restorations over amalgams. PEX-based materials do not contain Bisphenol A and are the least cytotoxic material available.

Most modern composite resins are light-cured photopolymers, meaning that they harden with light exposure. They can then be polished to achieve maximum aesthetic results. Composite resins experience a very small amount of shrinkage upon curing, causing the material to pull away from the walls of the cavity preparation. This makes the tooth slightly more vulnerable to microleakage and recurrent decay. Microleakage can be minimized or eliminated with proper handling techniques and appropriate material selection.

In some circumstances, using composite resin allows less of the tooth structure to be removed compared to other dental materials such as amalgam and indirect methods of restoration. This is because composite resins bind to enamel (and dentin too, although not as well) via a micromechanical bond. As conservation of tooth structure is a key ingredient in tooth preservation, many dentists prefer placing materials like composite instead of amalgam fillings whenever possible.

Generally, composite fillings are used to fill a carious lesion involving highly visible areas (such as the central incisors or any other teeth that can be seen when smiling) or when conservation of tooth structure is a top priority.

The bond of composite resin to tooth is especially affected by moisture contamination and the cleanliness of the prepared surface. Other materials can be selected when restoring teeth where moisture control techniques are not effective.

==== Glass ionomer cement ====
The concept of using "smart" materials in dentistry has attracted a lot of attention in recent years. Conventional glass ionomer cements (GICs) have many applications in dentistry. They are biocompatible with the dental pulp to some extent. Clinically, this material was initially used as a biomaterial to replace the lost osseous tissues in the human body.

GIC fillings are a mixture of glass and an organic acid.

The cavity preparation of a GIC filling is the same as a composite resin. GICs are chemically set via an acid-base reaction. Upon mixing of the material components, no light cure is needed to harden the material once placed in the cavity preparation. After the initial set, GICs still need time to fully set and harden.

An advantage of GICs compared to other restorative materials is that they can be placed in cavities without any need for bonding agents. Another advantage is that they are not subject to shrinkage and microleakage, as the bonding mechanism is an acid-base reaction and not a polymerization reaction. Additionally, GICs contain and release fluoride, which is important to prevent carious lesions. As GICs release their fluoride, they can be "recharged" by the use of fluoride-containing toothpaste; this means they can be used to treat patients at high risk of caries.

Although they are tooth-colored, GICs vary in translucency, and their aesthetic potential is not as great as that of composite resins. Newer formulations that contain light-cured resins can achieve a greater aesthetic result, but do not release fluoride as well as conventional GICs.

The most important disadvantage of GICs is lack of adequate strength and toughness. To improve the mechanical properties of the conventional GIC, resin-modified ionomers have been marketed. GICs are usually weak after setting and are not stable in water; however, they become stronger with the progression of reactions and become more resistant to moisture.

New generations of GICs aim to regenerate tissues; they use bioactive materials in the form of a powder or solution to induce local tissue repair. These materials release chemical agents in the form of dissolved ions or growth factors such as bone morphogenetic protein, which stimulates activate cells.

GICs are about as expensive as composite resin. The fillings do not wear as well as composite resin fillings, but they are generally considered good materials to use for root caries and for sealants.

==== Resin modified glass-ionomer cement (RMGIC) ====
A combination of glass-ionomer and composite resin, these fillings are a mixture of glass, an organic acid, and resin monomers that harden when light cured (light-activated polymerization besides the acid-base reaction of conventional GICs). The cost is similar to composite resin. It holds up better than GIC, but not as well as composite resin, and is not recommended for biting surfaces of adult teeth, or when control of moisture cannot be achieved.

Generally, RMGICs can achieve a better aesthetic result than conventional GICs, but not as good as pure composites.

==== Compomers ====
Another combination of composite resin and GIC technology, compomers are essentially made up of filler, dimethacrylate monomer, difunctional resin, photo-activator and initiator, and hydrophilic monomers. The filler decreases the proportion of resin and increases the mechanical strength, as well as improving the material's appearance.

Although compomers have better mechanical and aesthetic properties than RMGIC, they have some disadvantages which limit their applications:

- Compomers have weaker wear properties.
- They cannot adhere to tooth tissue due to the presence of resin, which can make it shrink on polymerisation. They therefore require bonding materials.
- They release low levels of fluoride, so cannot act as a fluoride reservoir.
- They have high staining susceptibility; uptake of oral fluid causes them to show staining soon after placement.

Due to its relatively weaker mechanical properties, Compomers are unfit for stress-bearing restorations but can be used in the deciduous dentition where lower loads are anticipated.

==== Cermets ====
Dental cermets, also known as silver cermets, were created to improve the wear resistance and hardness of glass ionomer cements by adding silver. Their other advantages are that they adhere directly to tooth tissue, and are radio-opaque, which helps with identification of secondary caries when future radiographs are taken.

However, cermets have poorer aesthetics, appearing metallic rather than white. They also have a similar compressive strength, flexural strength, and solubility as GICs, some of the main limiting factors for both materials. In addition, their fluoride release is poorer than that of GICs. Clinical studies have shown cermets perform poorly. All these disadvantages led to the decline in the use of this restorative material.

=== Indirect restorative materials ===
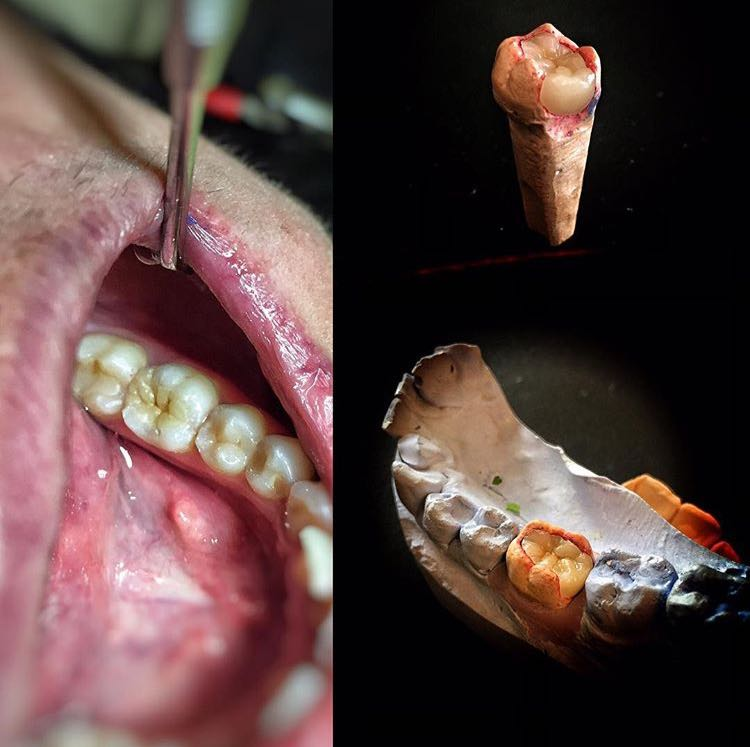
A fabricated indirect restoration (inlay) made of porcelain

An indirect restoration is one where the teeth are first prepared, then an impression is taken and sent to a dental technician who fabricates the restoration according to the dentist's prescription.

==== Porcelain ====
Porcelain fillings are hard, but can cause wear on opposing teeth. Their hardness and rigidity enables them to resist abrasion forces, and are good aesthetically as they mimic the appearance of natural teeth. However, they are also brittle and not always recommended for molar fillings. Porcelain materials can be strengthened by soaking fired material in molten salt to allow exchange of sodium and potassium ions on the surface; this successfully creates compressive stresses on the outer layer, by controlling cooling after firing, and by the use of pure alumina inserts, a core of alumina or alumina powder, as they act as crack stoppers and are highly compatible to porcelain.

==== Dental composite materials ====
Tooth colored dental composite materials are either used as a direct filling or as the construction material for an indirect inlay. They are usually cured by light.

==== Nano-ceramic particles ====
Nano-ceramic particles embedded in a resin matrix are less brittle and therefore less likely to crack, or chip, than all-ceramic indirect fillings. They absorb the shock of chewing more like natural teeth, and more like resin or gold fillings, than do ceramic fillings; at the same time they are more resistant to wear than all-resin indirect fillings. They are available in blocks for use with CAD/CAM systems.

==== Gold fillings ====
Gold fillings have excellent durability, wear well, and do not cause excessive wear to the opposing teeth, but they do conduct heat and cold, which can be irritating. There are two categories: cast gold fillings (gold inlays and onlays) made with 14 or 18 kt gold, and gold foil made with pure 24 kt gold that is burnished layer by layer. For years, they have been considered the benchmark of restorative dental materials. However, recent advances in dental porcelains and a consumer focus on aesthetic results have caused the demand for gold fillings to drop. Gold fillings are sometimes quite expensive, but they last a very long time, meaning that gold restorations are less costly and painful in the long run. It is not uncommon for a gold crown to last 30 years.

=== Other historical fillings ===
Lead fillings were used in the 18th century, but became unpopular in the 19th century because of their softness. This was before lead poisoning was understood.

According to American Civil War-era dental handbooks, since the early 19th century metallic fillings had been made of lead, gold, tin, platinum, silver, aluminum, or amalgam. A pellet was rolled slightly larger than the cavity, condensed into place with instruments, then shaped and polished in the patient's mouth. The filling was usually left "high", with final condensation—"tamping down"—occurring while the patient chewed food. Gold foil was the most popular filling material during the Civil War. Tin and amalgam were also popular due to lower cost, but were held in lower regard.

One survey of dental practices in the mid-19th century catalogued dental fillings found in the remains of seven Confederate soldiers from the Civil War. They were made of:

- Gold foil: preferred because of its durability and safety.
- Platinum: rarely used because it was too hard, inflexible and difficult to form into foil.
- Aluminum: failed because of its lack of malleability but has been added to some amalgams.
- Tin and iron: believed to have been a very popular filling material during the Civil War. Tin foil was recommended when a cheaper material than gold was requested by the patient, but it wore down rapidly; even if it could be replaced cheaply and quickly, there was a concern, specifically from Chapin A. Harris, that it would oxidise in the mouth and cause a recurrence of caries. Due to blackening, tin was only recommended for posterior teeth.
- Thorium: the element's radioactivity was unknown at that time, and the dentist probably thought he was working with tin.
- Lead and tungsten mixture: probably from shotgun pellets. Lead was rarely used in the 19th century, as it is soft and quickly worn down by mastication, and had known harmful health effects.

=== Acrylic polymers ===
Acrylics are used in the fabrication of dentures, artificial teeth, impression trays, maxillofacial / orthodontic appliances and temporary (provisional) restorations. They cannot be used as tooth filling materials because they can lead to pulpitis and periodontitis, as they may generate heat and acids during setting, and in addition they shrink.

=== Failure of dental restorations ===
Fillings have a finite lifespan; composites appear to have a higher failure rate than amalgam over five to seven years. How well people keep their teeth clean and avoid cavities is probably a more important factor than the material chosen for the restoration.

=== Evaluation and regulation of dental materials ===
The Nordic Institute of Dental Materials (NIOM) performs several tests to evaluate dental products in the Nordic countries. In the European Union, dental materials are classified as medical devices according to the Medical Devices Directive. In USA, the Food and Drug Administration is the regulatory body for dental products.
