= Ueq 12-1 =

Ion channel toxin

Identifiers
3D model (JSmol)	Interactive image
- InChI: InChI=1S/C189H261N63O66S10/c1-85-149(280)225-100(19-9-39-202-187(193)194)157(288)243-125-76-323-328-81-130-179(310)248-124(173(304)218-87(3)186(317)318)75-322-321-74-123(242-170(301)116(56-148(278)279)234-166(297)111(51-94-60-201-84-215-94)232-161(292)106(45-88-15-5-4-6-16-88)220-138(263)62-208-154(285)119(69-254)240-159(290)103(228-175(125)306)35-38-144(270)271)156(287)210-65-141(266)223-120(70-255)171(302)235-115(55-147(276)277)169(300)233-110(50-93-59-200-83-214-93)165(296)231-108(48-91-57-205-99-18-8-7-17-97(91)99)163(294)246-127-78-325-324-77-126(174(305)227-102(34-37-143(268)269)152(283)206-61-136(261)216-85)245-162(293)107(46-89-25-29-95(257)30-26-89)230-167(298)112(52-135(192)260)237-182(313)133-24-14-44-252(133)183(314)104(21-11-41-204-189(197)198)229-172(303)121(71-256)241-177(308)128(79-326-327-80-129(178(309)249-130)244-158(289)101(20-10-40-203-188(195)196)226-168(299)113(53-145(272)273)222-140(265)63-207-153(284)118(68-253)239-150(281)86(2)217-160(291)114(54-146(274)275)236-176(127)307)247-164(295)109(49-92-58-199-82-213-92)221-139(264)64-209-155(286)122-73-320-319-72-98(190)151(282)238-117(47-90-27-31-96(258)32-28-90)185(316)251-43-13-23-132(251)181(312)211-66-137(262)219-105(33-36-134(191)259)184(315)250-42-12-22-131(250)180(311)212-67-142(267)224-122/h4-8,15-18,25-32,57-60,82-87,98,100-133,205,253-258H,9-14,19-24,33-56,61-81,190H2,1-3H3,(H2,191,259)(H2,192,260)(H,199,213)(H,200,214)(H,201,215)(H,206,283)(H,207,284)(H,208,285)(H,209,286)(H,210,287)(H,211,312)(H,212,311)(H,216,261)(H,217,291)(H,218,304)(H,219,262)(H,220,263)(H,221,264)(H,222,265)(H,223,266)(H,224,267)(H,225,280)(H,226,299)(H,227,305)(H,228,306)(H,229,303)(H,230,298)(H,231,296)(H,232,292)(H,233,300)(H,234,297)(H,235,302)(H,236,307)(H,237,313)(H,238,282)(H,239,281)(H,240,290)(H,241,308)(H,242,301)(H,243,288)(H,244,289)(H,245,293)(H,246,294)(H,247,295)(H,248,310)(H,249,309)(H,268,269)(H,270,271)(H,272,273)(H,274,275)(H,276,277)(H,278,279)(H,317,318)(H4,193,194,202)(H4,195,196,203)(H4,197,198,204)/t85-,86-,87-,98-,100-,101-,102-,103-,104-,105-,106-,107-,108-,109-,110-,111-,112-,113-,114-,115-,116-,117-,118-,119-,120-,121-,122-,123-,124-,125-,126-,127-,128-,129-,130-,131-,132-,133-/m0/s1 Key: QNXZCGAZPBPTPU-SIANINEVSA-N
- SMILES: N[C@@]([H])(CS3)C(=O)N[C@@]([H])(Cc1ccc(O)cc1)C(=O)N1[C@@]([H])(CCC1)C(=O)NCC(=O)N[C@@]([H])(CCC(=O)N)C(=O)N1[C@@]([H])(CCC1)C(=O)NCC(=O)N[C@@]([H])(CS3)C(=O)NCC(=O)N[C@@]([H])(CC1=CN=C-N1)C(=O)N[C@@]([H])(CS4)C(=O)N[C@@]([H])(CO)C(=O)N[C@@]([H])(CCCNC(=N)N)C(=O)N1[C@@]([H])(CCC1)C(=O)N[C@@]([H])(CC(=O)N)C(=O)N[C@@]([H])(Cc1ccc(O)cc1)C(=O)N[C@@]([H])(CS5)C(=O)N[C@@]([H])(CCC(=O)O)C(=O)NCC(=O)N[C@@]([H])(C)C(=O)N[C@@]([H])(CCCNC(=N)N)C(=O)N[C@@]([H])(CS6)C(=O)N[C@@]([H])(CCC(=O)O)C(=O)N[C@@]([H])(CO)C(=O)NCC(=O)N[C@@]([H])(Cc1ccccc1)C(=O)N[C@@]([H])(CC1=CN=C-N1)C(=O)N[C@@]([H])(CC(=O)O)C(=O)N[C@@]([H])(CS7)C(=O)NCC(=O)N[C@@]([H])(CO)C(=O)N[C@@]([H])(CC(=O)O)C(=O)N[C@@]([H])(CC1=CN=C-N1)C(=O)N[C@@]([H])(CC(=CN2)C1=C2C=CC=C1)C(=O)N[C@@]([H])(CS5)C(=O)N[C@@]([H])(CC(=O)O)C(=O)N[C@@]([H])(C)C(=O)N[C@@]([H])(CO)C(=O)NCC(=O)N[C@@]([H])(CC(=O)O)C(=O)N[C@@]([H])(CCCNC(=N)N)C(=O)N[C@@]([H])(CS4)C(=O)N[C@@]([H])(CS6)C(=O)N[C@@]([H])(CS7)C(=O)N[C@@]([H])(C)C(=O)O

Properties
Chemical formula	C_{189}H_{261}N_{63}O_{66}S_{10}
Molar mass	4792.14 g·mol^{−1}
- Except where otherwise noted, data are given for materials in their standard state (at 25 °C [77 °F], 100 kPa). Infobox references

Ueq 12-1 (also called τ-AnmTx Ueq 12-1) is a bioactive peptide neurotoxin isolated from the sea anemone Urticina eques. It is known for targeting the Transient Receptor Potential Ankyrin 1 (TRPA1) ion channel involved in pain pathways and for possessing mild antibacterial activity against Gram-positive bacteria. It is researched as a potential preclinical lead compound for novel pain treatment in mice.

== Etymology ==
The systematic name τ-AnmTx Ueq 12-1 follows the standardized nomenclature for sea anemone toxins:

τ- (tau-) classifies its functional activity as a TRP channel modulator, AnmTx stands as an abbreviation of Anemone Toxin, while the Ueq represents the source species Urticina eques. The designation “12-1” indicates that it is the first characterized member on the 12th structural subgroup of sea anemone peptides.

== Source ==
Ueq 12-1 is isolated from the mucus and ectodermal secretions of Urticina eques. The specimens used in its initial characterisation were collected near Tromsø, Norway.

== Chemistry ==
Predicted 3D structure of Ueq 12-1 protein

Ueq 12-1 is an anionic peptide consisting of 45 amino acids and 10 cysteine residues that form five intramolecular disulfide bonds. The peptide sequence of Ueq 12-1 is CYPGQPGCGHCSRPNYCEGARCESGFHDCGSDHWCDASGDRCCCA.

It has a monoisotopic molecular mass of 4788.63 Da, a calculated isoelectric point (pI) of 5.28, and a net charge of (-3) at neutral pH level.

Nuclear Magnetic Resonance (NMR) spectroscopy reveals a novel W-shaped spatial fold that includes a core 3-stranded antiparallel β-sheet, a small 2-stranded parallel β-sheet and one turn of a 3_{10} helix.

The full protein sequence and more functional information can be found at Universal Protein Database (UniProt) under the code C0HK26.

== Target ==
The primary molecular target of Ueq 12-1 is the Transient Receptor Potential Ankyrin 1 (TRPA1) cation channel. This specific channel is excitatory and functions in diverse sensory processes, such as thermal nociception and inflammatory pain. Additionally, Ueq 12-1 targets specific Gram-positive bacteria, showing inhibitory activity against strains such as Corynebacterium glutamicum and Staphylococcus aureus.

== Mode of action ==
Ueq 12-1 functions as a peptide enhancer of TRPA1 potentiates the calcium influx and ion currents triggered by agonists like allyl isothiocyanate (AITC) or diclofenac. At higher concentrations, it desensitizes TRPA1 expressing sensory neurons, which results in significant in vivo analgesic and anti-inflammatory relief against AITC induced pain and swelling.

== Toxicity ==
Within performed experimental studies, Ueq 12-1 displays a favorable safety and toxicity profile, as local paw injection (0.2 mg/kg) in mice caused no pain, edema or thermal hyperalgesia. Intravenous administration produced no sedation or motor impairment during open-field behavioral tests. Its growth inhibitory toxicity is selectively targeted toward Gram-positive bacteria, showing no toxicity towards Gram-negative bacteria like Escherichia coli and Pseudomonas aeruginosa.

Human toxicity remains uncharacterised.

== Treatment ==
The current studies do not report a treatment or antidote for exposure to Ueq 12-1.

== Therapeutic use ==
In animal models, intravenous administration of Ueq 12-1 acts as a potential analgesic and anti-inflammatory treatment lead. In acute pain, provoked by AITC, Ueq 12-1 reduces pain-like behaviors – decreasing paw licking by 49%, while suppressing local paw swelling by up to 57%. In models of persistent inflammatory pain induced by Complete Freund’s Adjuvant (CFA), Ueq 12-1 reverses thermal hyperalgesia within 30 minutes and reduces paw edema by 27% within 24 hours.

As Ueq 12-1 is a bifunctional peptide with selective antibacterial properties against Gram-positive bacteria, it serves as a potential drug lead for managing inflammatory pain while reducing secondary infection risks.

No human benefit is established.
