= Endodontic crown =

Dental prosthetic

An endodontic crown or endocrown is a single prostheses fabricated from reinforced ceramics, indicated for endodontically treated molar teeth that have significant loss of coronal structure. Endocrowns are formed from a monoblock containing the coronal portion invaded in the apical projection that fills the pulp chamber space, and possibly the root canal entrances; they have the advantage of removing lower amounts of sound tissue compared to other techniques, and with much lower chair time needed. They are luted to the tooth structure by an adhesive material. The ceramic can be milled using computer-aided techniques or molded under pressure. Endocrowns can be an alternative to conventional crown restorations.

== History and classical approach ==
It was Bindl and Mörmann who named this restorative procedure "endocrown" in 1999, defining it as a total porcelain crown fixed to a depulped posterior tooth, which is anchored to the internal portion of the pulp chamber and to the cavity margins, thus obtaining macromechanical retention (provided by the pulpal walls) for restoring endodontically treated teeth.

The classical approach is to build up the tooth with a post and core, which have physical properties close to those of natural dentin, utilizing adhesive procedures and placement of full-coverage crowns with a sufficient ferrule, but it was found that excessive amount of teeth removal may cause fracture to the teeth. The literature suggests that endocrowns may perform similarly or better than the conventional treatments using intraradicular posts, direct composite resin or inlay/onlay restorations.

== Indications and contraindications ==
Endocrowns are especially indicated in cases of molar teeth with short, or fragile roots. They may also be used in situations of excessive loss of coronal dental tissue. Reinforced, acid-etchable dental ceramics have been the materials of choice for the fabrication of endocrowns because they guarantee the mechanical strength needed to withstand the forces exerted on the tooth, as well as the bond strength of the restoration to the cavity walls.

Using endocrowns for premolars is contraindicated as the tooth is more likely to be subjected to lateral forces during mastication than molars because of the steep cuspal incline. Therefore, premolars are prone to fracture after restoration.

== Clinical trials and research ==
A systemic review and meta-analysis showed a success rate of endocrowns varying from 94 to 100%. Analysis in posterior and anterior teeth demonstrated that endocrowns had higher fracture strength than conventional treatments. Another study showed that an endodontic crown preparation appeared acceptable for molar crowns but inadequate for premolar crowns. A 2026 finite element analysis investigated the effects of restorative material and ferrule height on the biomechanical behavior of endocrowns in endodontically treated maxillary and mandibular central incisors. The study found differences in stress distribution between the two types of incisors and among the restorative materials evaluated.

The longest duration of survival is for molar endocrowns is a five-year clinical follow-up period, with success rate of 87.1%. Root fracture is a very possible finding in premolar and anterior teeth.
