= Clinical uses of mesenchymal stem cells =

Adult mesenchymal stem cells are being used by researchers in the fields of regenerative medicine and tissue engineering to artificially reconstruct human tissue which has been previously damaged. Mesenchymal stem cells are able to differentiate, or mature from a less specialized cell to a more specialized cell type, to replace damaged tissues in various organs.

== Isolation of mesenchymal stem cells ==
=== Obtaining mesenchymal stem cells from the bone marrow ===
In the research process of expanding the therapeutic uses of mesenchymal stem cells, they are grown in laboratories or grown using medication to stimulate new cell growth within the human body. In mesenchymal stem cell therapy, most of the cells are extracted from the adult patient's bone marrow Mesenchymal stem cells can be obtained via a procedure called bone marrow aspiration. A needle is inserted into the back of the patients hip bone and cells are removed to be grown under controlled in vitro conditions in a lab. Over a course of two or three weeks, the cells will multiply and differentiate into specialized cells. The number of fully differentiated cells and their phenotype can be influenced in three ways. The first one is by varying the initial seed density in the culture medium. The second is by changing the conditions of the medium. The third is by the addition of additives such as proteins or growth hormones to the culture medium to promote growth. The mature cells are then harvested and injected back into the patient through local delivery or systemic infusion.

=== Isolation efficiency ===
Isolation of mesenchymal stem cells from the bone marrow requires an invasive procedure. Mesenchymal stem cells can also be isolated from birth-associated tissues such as the umbilical cord without the need for an invasive surgical procedure. Differences in isolation efficiency are attributed to the availability, condition, and age of the donor tissue. An issue related to culturing mesenchymal stem cells is the insufficient number of cells that can be produced. During long-term culture, mesenchymal stem cells age, lose their ability to differentiate, and have a higher chance to undergo malignant transformation.

== Therapeutic properties ==
Mesenchymal stem cells possess many properties that are ideal for the treatment of inflammatory and degenerative diseases. They can differentiate into many cell types including bone, fat, and muscle which allow them to treat a large range of disorders. They possess natural abilities to detect changes in their environment, such as inflammation. They can then induce the release of bioactive agents and the formation of progenitor cells in response to these changes. Mesenchymal stem cells have also been shown to travel to sites of inflammation far from the injection site.

Mesenchymal stem cells can be easily extracted through well-established procedures such as bone marrow aspiration. Also, transplanted mesenchymal stem cells pose little risk for rejection as they are derived from the patients own tissue, so are genetically identical, however graft versus host disease is a possibility, where the cells change enough while outside the patient's body that the immune system recognizes them as foreign and can attempt to reject them. This can lead to symptoms such as itchiness, sensitive/raw skin and shedding or dry skin. .

== Advantages over embryonic stem cells ==
Several different forms of stem cells have been identified and studied in the field of regenerative medicine. One of the most extensively studied stem cell types are embryonic stem cells, which possess many of the same therapeutic properties as mesenchymal stem cells, including the ability to self-regenerate and differentiate into a number of cell lineages. Their therapeutic abilities have been demonstrated in a number of studies of autoimmunity and neurodegeneration in animal models.

However, their therapeutic potential has been largely limited by several key factors. Injected embryonic stem cells have been shown to increase the risk for tumor formation in the host patient. Also, the host's immune system may reject injected embryonic stem cells and thus eliminate their therapeutic effects. Finally, research has been largely limited due to the ethical issues that surround their controversial procurement from fertilized embryos.

== Safety concerns ==
Human mesenchymal stem cell therapy is limited due to variation in individual response to treatment and the high number of cells needed for treatment. More long-term studies are needed to ensure the safety of mesenchymal stem cells. In previous studies which observed the safety of clinical mesenchymal stem cell use, no serious side effects were noted. However, there have been some cases where there were both improvement and toxicity inflicted on the targeted organ, as well as cases where treatment of mesenchymal stem cells did not show improvement of function at all. In addition, there is a risk of tumorigenesis after stem cell transplantation due to the ability of stem cells to proliferate and resist apoptosis. Genetic mutations in stem cells as well as conditions at target tissue may result in formation of a cancerous tumor. Studies have shown that bone marrow mesenchymal stem cells can migrate to solid tumors and promote tumor growth in various cancer models through the secretion of proangiogenic factors.

== Treated disorders ==
Mesenchymal stem cells have been used to treat a variety of disorders including cardiovascular diseases, spinal cord injury, bone and cartilage repair, and autoimmune diseases.

=== Treatment for multiple sclerosis ===
A vast amount research has been conducted in recent years for the use of mesenchymal stem cells to treat multiple sclerosis. This form of treatment for the disease has been tested in many studies of experimental allergic encephalomyelitis, the animal model of multiple sclerosis, and several published and on-going phase I and phase II human trials.

==== Treatment requirements ====
Current treatments are unable to prevent the accumulation of irreversible damage to the central nervous system. Patients with multiple sclerosis experience two major forms of damage, one from on-going autoimmune induced processes and the other to natural pair mechanisms. Therefore, an ideal treatment must possess both immunomodulating properties to control irregular autoimmune responses and regenerative properties to stimulate natural repair mechanisms that can replace damaged cells.

==== Therapeutic mechanisms ====
The exact therapeutic mechanisms of mesenchymal stem cells in the treatment of multiple sclerosis are still very much up to debate among stem cell researchers. Some of the suggested mechanisms are immunomodulation, neuroprotection, and neuroregeneration.

- Immunomodulation

Mesenchymal stem cells can induce the release of bioactive agents such as cytokines that can inhibit autoimmune responses. In patients with multiple sclerosis, autoreactive lymphocytes such as T and B cells cause damage to the central nervous system by attacking myelin proteins. Myelin proteins make up the myelin sheath that functions in protecting nerve axons, maintaining structural integrity, and enabling the efficient transmission of nerve impulses. By suppressing the unregulated proliferation of T and B cells, mesenchymal stem cells can potentially minimize and control on-going damage to the central nervous system.
Mesenchymal stem cells can also stimulate the maturation of antigen presenting cells. Antigen presenting cells trigger the immune system to produce antibodies that can destroy potentially harmful agents. This property allows mesenchymal stem cells to actively contribute to neutralizing harmful autoreactive T and B cells.

- Neuroprotection

Mesenchymal stem cells can promote neuroprotection in the central nervous systems which may prevent the progression of chronic disability. The mechanisms include inhibiting apoptosis of healthy cells and preventing gliosis, the formation of a glial scar. They can also stimulate local progenitor cells to produce replacement cells for rebuilding the myelin sheath.

- Neuroregeneration

The regenerative abilities of the central nervous system are greatly decreased in adults, impairing its ability to regenerate axons following injury. In addition to this natural limitation, patients with multiple sclerosis exhibit an even greater decrease in neuroregeneration along with enhanced neurodegeneration. They experience a significant decrease in the number of neural stem cells which produce progenitor cells necessary for normal maintenance and function. Decreases in the neural stem cells results in severe damage to the ability of the central nervous system to repair itself. This process results in the amplified neurodegeneration exhibited in patients with multiple sclerosis.

Mesenchymal stem cells have the ability to stimulate neuroregeneration by differentiating into neural stem cells in response to inflammation. The neural stem cells can then promote the repair of damaged axons and create replacement cells for the damaged tissue. Regeneration and repair of damaged axons has been shown to occur naturally and spontaneously in the central nervous system. This shows that it is an environment capable of unassisted, natural healing. Mesenchymal stem cells contribute to this regenerative environment by releasing bioactive agents that inhibit apoptosis and thus create an ideal regenerative environment.

=== Cardiovascular Diseases ===
Mesenchymal stem cells are able to alleviate heart fiber injury and prevent cardiac muscle cell death in mouse models of myocardial infarction, or heart attack, and prevent its further development. They can migrate to areas of inflammation and decrease infarction and improve cardiac function.

=== Brain Disorders ===
Mesenchymal stem cells have the potential to treat brain strokes as well. They can secrete factors that stimulate the function of brain cells, leading to neuron formation, blood vessel formation, and improved synaptic plasticity. They can also differentiate into neurons and neural cells to replace damaged cells. Behavioral tests performed in mouse models demonstrated a return to normal brain function after treatment with mesenchymal stem cells.

=== Liver Diseases ===
Mesenchymal stem cells can also regenerate and repair damaged liver cells. In mouse models of liver fibrosis, mesenchymal stem cells delivered to the liver were shown to improve liver function by reducing inflammation and necrosis and inducing hepatocyte regeneration.
