= Tarbuttite =

Phosphate mineral

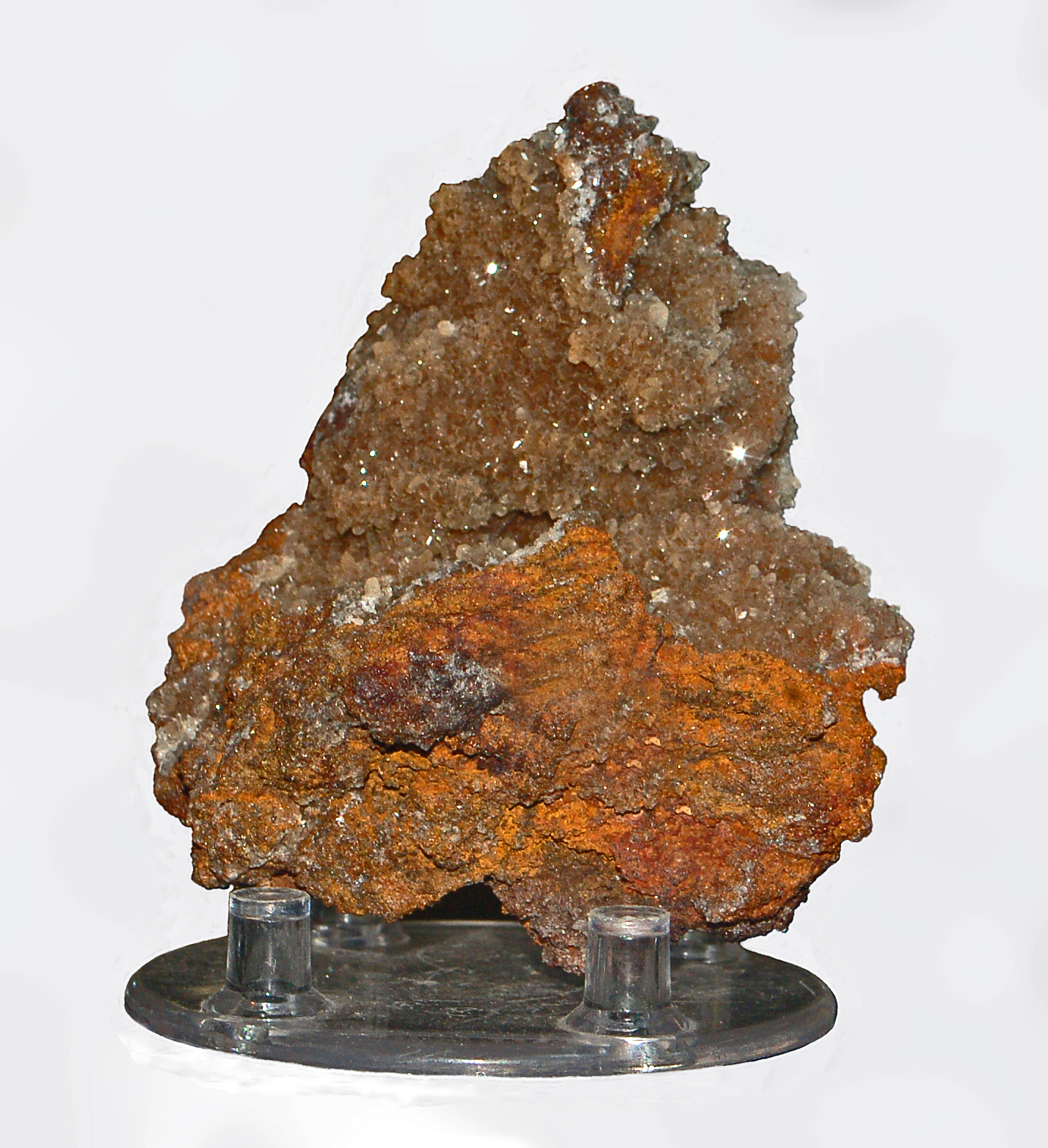
- Tarbuttite from Broken Hill mine (Kabwe mine) in Central Province, Zambia

General
- Category: Phosphate minerals
- Formula: Zn_{2}(PO_{4})(OH)
- IMA symbol: Tbt
- Strunz classification: 8.BB.35
- Dana classification: 41.6.7.1
- Crystal system: Triclinic
- Crystal class: Pinacoidal (1̅) (same H-M symbol)
- Space group: P1̅
- Unit cell: a = 5.400 Å, b = 5.654 Å c = 6.465 Å, α = 102.51° β = 102.46°, γ = 86.50° Z = 2

Identification
- Color: White, colorless, yellow, red, green, or brown
- Crystal habit: Equant to short prismatic [001], sheaf-like aggregates, crusts, individual crystals rounded and deeply striated
- Cleavage: Perfect on {010}
- Fracture: Irregular, uneven
- Mohs scale hardness: 3.5
- Luster: Vitreous, pearly on cleavages
- Streak: White
- Diaphaneity: Transparent, translucent
- Specific gravity: 4.12; 4.19 (calc.)
- Density: 4.12 g/cm^{3} (measured)
- Optical properties: Biaxial (−)
- Refractive index: n_{α} = 1.660 n_{β} = 1.705 n_{γ} = 1.713
- Birefringence: δ = 0.053
- 2V angle: 50° (measured)
- Dispersion: Weak, strong
- Ultraviolet fluorescence: Non-fluorescent

Tarbuttite is a rare phosphate mineral with formula Zn_{2}(PO_{4})(OH). It was discovered in 1907 in what is now Zambia and named for Percy Coventry Tarbutt.

== Description and habit ==
Tarbuttite is white, yellow, red, green, brown, or colorless; in transmitted light it is colorless. Traces of copper cause green coloring, while iron hydroxides cause the other colors. Colorless crystals tend to be transparent while colored specimens have varying degrees of transparency.

The mineral occurs as equant to short prismatic crystals up to 2 cm (0.79 in), in sheaf-like or saddle-shaped aggregates, or as crusts. Individual crystals are commonly rounded and striated.

== Structure ==
Zinc ions are surrounded by oxygen in a nearly perfect trigonal bipyramid and phosphate groups are tetrahedral. The crystal structure consists of zig-zag chains of Zn_{1} polyhedra linked by phosphate groups and pairs of Zn_{2} polyhedra. In each unit cell are two formula units of Zn_{2}(PO_{4})(OH).

== History ==
Tarbuttite was discovered in 1907 in Broken Hill mine, Northern Rhodesia, (now Kabwe, Zambia). The mineral was described from specimens in cellular limonite in the largest hill of the group, Kopje No. 2. In a cave discovered in Kopje No. 1 by boring a tunnel, tarbuttite was also found in association with hopeite as obscure crystals and crystals smaller than 1/16 mm (0.0025 in) and as an encrustation on some bones. Several specimens of the mineral were collected by Percy Coventry Tarbutt, a director of the Broken Hill Exploration Company. In 1907, the name tarbuttite was proposed by L.J. Spencer in the journal Nature in honor of Tarbutt.

When the International Mineralogical Association was founded, tarbuttite was grandfathered as a valid mineral species.

== Occurrence ==
Tarbuttite has been found in Algeria, Angola, Australia, Canada, China, Namibia, the United States, and Zambia.

Tarbuttite forms as secondary mineral in oxidized zinc deposits. It has been found in association with cerussite, descloizite, hemimorphite, hopeite, hydrozincite, "limonite", parahopeite, pyromorphite, scholzite, smithsonite, and vanadinite.

== See also ==
- List of minerals named after people
