= Bioactive =

Bioactive may refer to:

- Biological activity, the effect of a drug or compound on living matter
- Bioactive agents, substances that can influence an organism, tissue or cell
- Bioactive compounds, a compound that has an effect on a living organism, tissue/cell
- Bioactive glass, a group of surface reactive glass-ceramic biomaterials used as implanted devices in the human body to repair and replace diseased or damaged bones
- Bioactive paper, a paper-based sensor that can identify various contaminants in food and water
- Bioactive terrarium, a terrarium/vivarium which includes a population of invertebrates and microbes to process animal waste
- Bioactivity, the ability of an engineered biomaterial to induce a physiological response that is supportive of the biomaterial's function and performance
