= 2-Ethoxybenzoic acid =

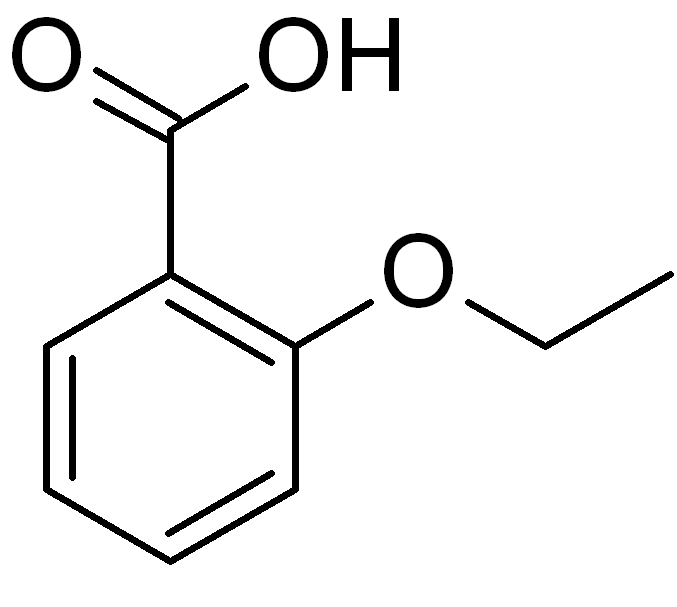

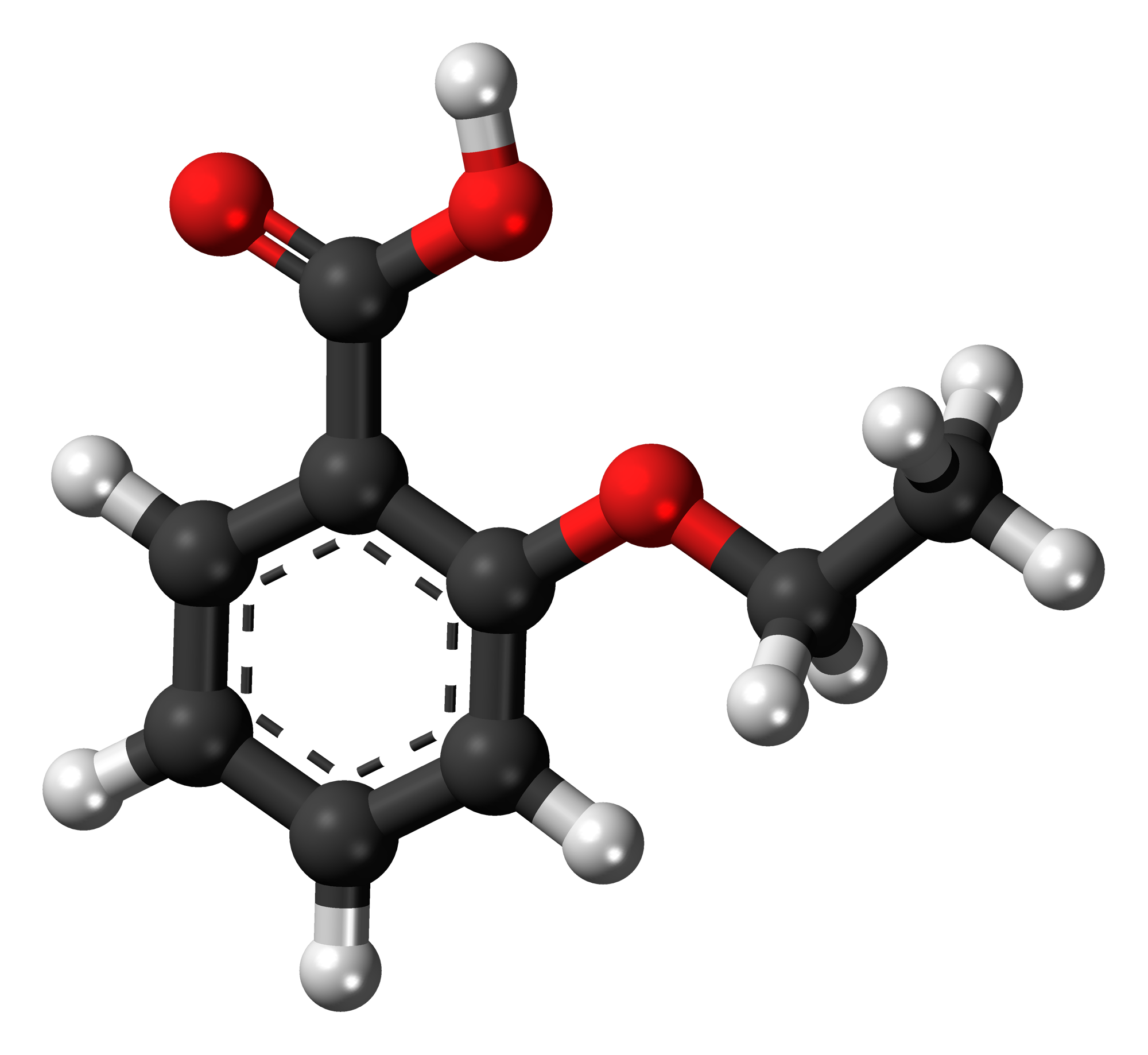

Names
- Preferred IUPAC name 2-Ethoxybenzoic acid

Identifiers
CAS Number	134-11-2
3D model (JSmol)	Interactive image; Interactive image
ChemSpider	60586
ECHA InfoCard	100.004.665
PubChem CID	67252
UNII	5IN9FDI7TT
CompTox Dashboard (EPA)	DTXSID3059638
- InChI: InChI=1S/C9H10O3/c1-2-12-8-6-4-3-5-7(8)9(10)11/h3-6H,2H2,1H3,(H,10,11) Key: XDZMPRGFOOFSBL-UHFFFAOYSA-N; InChI=1/C9H10O3/c1-2-12-8-6-4-3-5-7(8)9(10)11/h3-6H,2H2,1H3,(H,10,11) Key: XDZMPRGFOOFSBL-UHFFFAOYAO
- SMILES: CCOC1=CC=CC=C1C(=O)O; O=C(O)c1ccccc1OCC

Properties
Chemical formula	C_{9}H_{10}O_{3}
Molar mass	166.176 g·mol^{−1}
Melting point	19 °C (66 °F; 292 K)

Hazards
NFPA 704 (fire diamond)	2 1 0
Safety data sheet (SDS)	Fischer Scientific
- Except where otherwise noted, data are given for materials in their standard state (at 25 °C [77 °F], 100 kPa). verify (what is ?) Infobox references

2-Ethoxybenzoic acid (o-ethoxybenzoic acid, EBA) is an organic compound, a carboxylic acid derived from benzoic acid. 2-Ethoxybenzoic acid is used as a component in some dental cements.
