= Zinc phosphate =

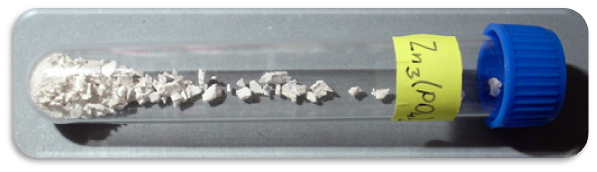
- Zinc phosphate

Names
- IUPAC name Zinc phosphate

Identifiers
CAS Number	7779-90-0
3D model (JSmol)	Interactive image
ChemSpider	22927
ECHA InfoCard	100.029.040
PubChem CID	24519
RTECS number	TD0590000
UNII	1E2MCT2M62
CompTox Dashboard (EPA)	DTXSID3064807
- InChI: InChI=1S/2H3O4P.3Zn/c2*1-5(2,3)4;;;/h2*(H3,1,2,3,4);;;/q;;3*+2/p-6 Key: LRXTYHSAJDENHV-UHFFFAOYSA-H; InChI=1/2H3O4P.3Zn/c2*1-5(2,3)4;;;/h2*(H3,1,2,3,4);;;/q;;3*+2/p-6 Key: LRXTYHSAJDENHV-CYFPFDDLAR
- SMILES: [Zn+2].[Zn+2].[Zn+2].[O-]P([O-])(=O)[O-].[O-]P([O-])([O-])=O

Properties
Chemical formula	Zn_{3}(PO_{4})_{2} (anhydrous); Zn_{3}(PO_{4})_{2}·4H_{2}O (tetrahydrate)
Molar mass	386.17 g⋅mol^{−1} (anhydrous); 458.231 g⋅mol^{−1} (tetrahydrate)
Appearance	white monoclinic crystals; colorless orthorhombic crystals
Density	4.0 g/cm^{3}
Melting point	900 °C (1,650 °F; 1,170 K)
Solubility in water	insoluble
Magnetic susceptibility (χ)	−141.0×10^{−6} cm^{3}/mol
Refractive index (n_{D})	1.595

Structure
Crystal structure	monoclinic

Thermochemistry
Std enthalpy of formation (Δ_{f}H^{⦵}_{298})	−2891.2 ± 3.3

Hazards
NFPA 704 (fire diamond)	2 0 0
Flash point	Non-flammable
- Except where otherwise noted, data are given for materials in their standard state (at 25 °C [77 °F], 100 kPa). verify (what is ?) Infobox references

Zinc phosphate is an inorganic compound with the formula Zn_{3}(PO_{4})_{2}. This white powder is widely used as a corrosion resistant coating on metal surfaces either as part of an electroplating process or applied as a primer pigment (see also red lead). It has largely displaced toxic materials based on lead or chromium, and by 2006 it had become the most commonly used corrosion inhibitor. Zinc phosphate coats better on a crystalline structure than bare metal, so a seeding agent is often used as a pre-treatment. One common pre-treatment agent is sodium pyrophosphate.

== Minerals ==
Natural forms of zinc phosphate include minerals hopeite and parahopeite. A somewhat similar mineral is natural hydrous zinc phosphate called tarbuttite, Zn_{2}(PO_{4})(OH). Both are known from oxidation zones of Zn ore beds and were formed through oxidation of sphalerite by the presence of phosphate-rich solutions. The anhydrous form has not yet been found naturally.

== Use ==
=== Dentistry ===
Zinc phosphate cement is the classically used dental cement. It is commonly used for luting permanent metal and zirconium dioxide restorations and as a base for other dental restorations. Zinc phosphate cement is used for cementation of inlays, crowns, bridges, and other orthodontic appliances and occasionally as a temporary restoration.
