= Nordic Institute of Dental Materials =

Norwegian research institute

Nordic Institute of Dental Materials AS
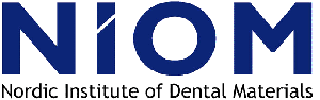
- Formation: 1972
- Type: Research & Development
- Headquarters: Sognsveien 70, Ullevål stadion, Oslo
- Location: Norway
- Official language: English, Norwegian
- Director: Jon E. Dahl
- Website: https://www.niom.no/

The Nordic Institute of Dental Materials AS (NIOM AS) is a Nordic Cooperative Body for dental biomaterials. The Institute’s activities in research, materials testing, standardisation and research-based consulting are directed towards dental health services and health authorities in the Nordic countries. The Institute is owned jointly by NORCE and the Norwegian Ministry of Health and Care Services. Activities are financed by the Nordic Council of Ministers and the Nordic ministries for health services. Materials testing and consulting services also generate income. As a joint Nordic resource center, NIOM collaborates with dental schools and research institutions and provides services to government health authorities, dental professionals, and the public in the Nordic countries in the field of dental biomaterials.

== History ==
NIOM was established in 1972, as a joint Nordic institute located close to Ullevaal Stadium in Oslo. A programme for testing and certification of dental biomaterials on the Nordic market was established, and the first lists of certified materials were published in 1974. Products were tested every year, and the Nordic health authorities required, or strongly recommended, that dentists used NIOM certified products. In 1992, the laboratory obtained official accreditation for testing dental biomaterials. These testing and certification activities continued until 1998 when the European Medical devices directive came into force, introducing a new, joint European regulatory scheme for the certification (CE marking) of medical and dental biomaterials and devices.

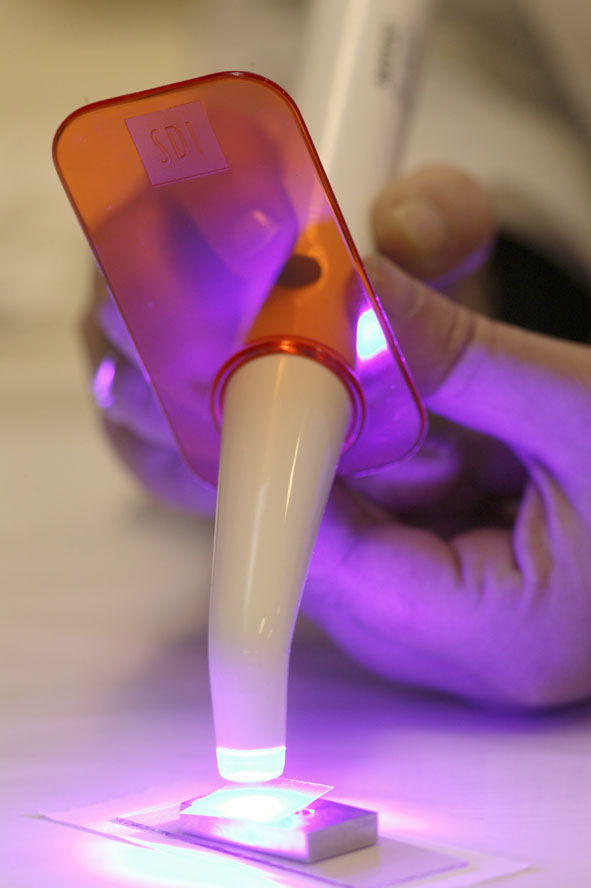
Light curing of a dental filling material to be tested

Today, the Institute maintains its competency in the accredited testing of dental biomaterials, and promotes this activity with manufacturers and regulatory bodies. Before 2004, had the responsibility as a Notified Body for the use of the CE mark on dental products. The provision of an accredited laboratory service to industry, health authorities and other parties remains one of NIOM's core activities.

On January 1, 2010 NIOM’s status changed from a Nordic Institute to a Nordic Co-operative Body. This means that ownership of NIOM is transferred from the Nordic Council of Ministers to UniRand a.s. (an arm of the University of Oslo) and the Norwegian Ministry of Health and Care Services to create a proprietary company, Nordic Institute of Dental Materials (NIOM). NIOM continues the work with the same staff and professional services.

From January 1.2019 NIOMs ownership is shared by NORCE (51 percent) and the Norwegian Ministry of Health and Care Services (49 percent).

== Research ==
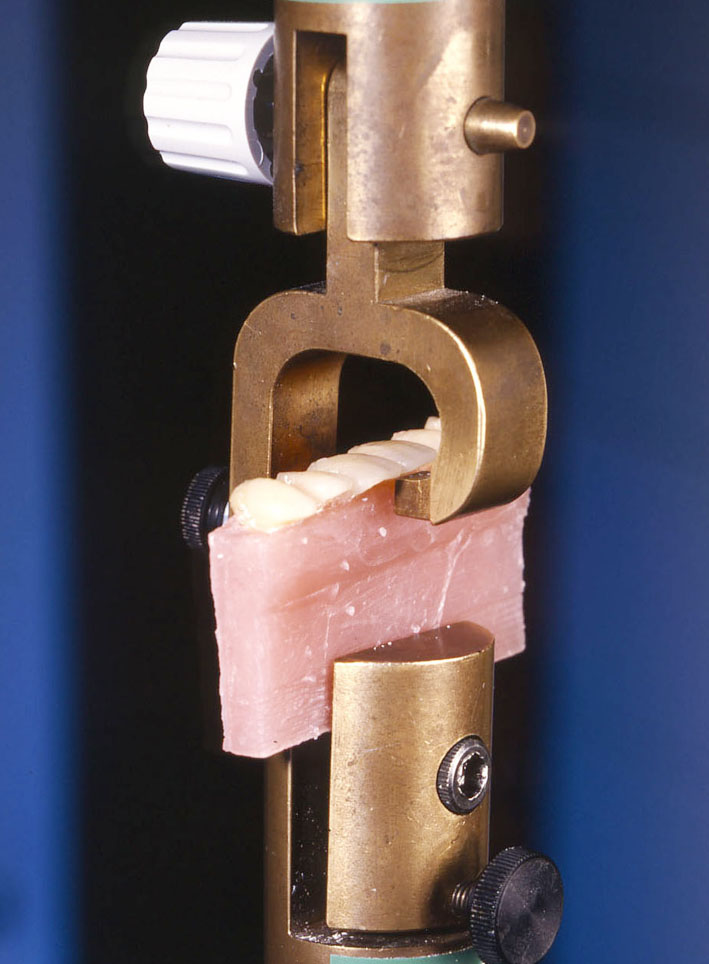
Testing of bonding strength of denture teeth

Research is a major part of the portfolio of work at NIOM. The institute collaborates with universities and research centres in dentistry, medicine and materials science in the Nordic countries and worldwide. Research underpins both standardization activities and the information and recommendations provided to health authorities, the dental profession and the public. Projects include material characterization and properties, biocompatibility and clinical performance.

== Services for dental professionals ==
NIOM provides evidence- and research-based information on dental biomaterials and medical devices to dental personnel, health authorities and to the public. This is promulgated through articles in the Nordic dental journals, journals for dental technicians. There is ongoing work on a register of dental products ("DMN" - Dentala Material Norden). NIOM also provides on-line services, E-mail and telephone, related to dental biomaterials.

== Testing and consulting services ==
NIOM carries out testing according to relevant product standards and according to selected methods as requested by the client. TNIOM offers consulting services in questions related to dental biomaterials. Consultancies cover questions related to properties, performance, safety and development of dental biomaterials.

== Standardization ==
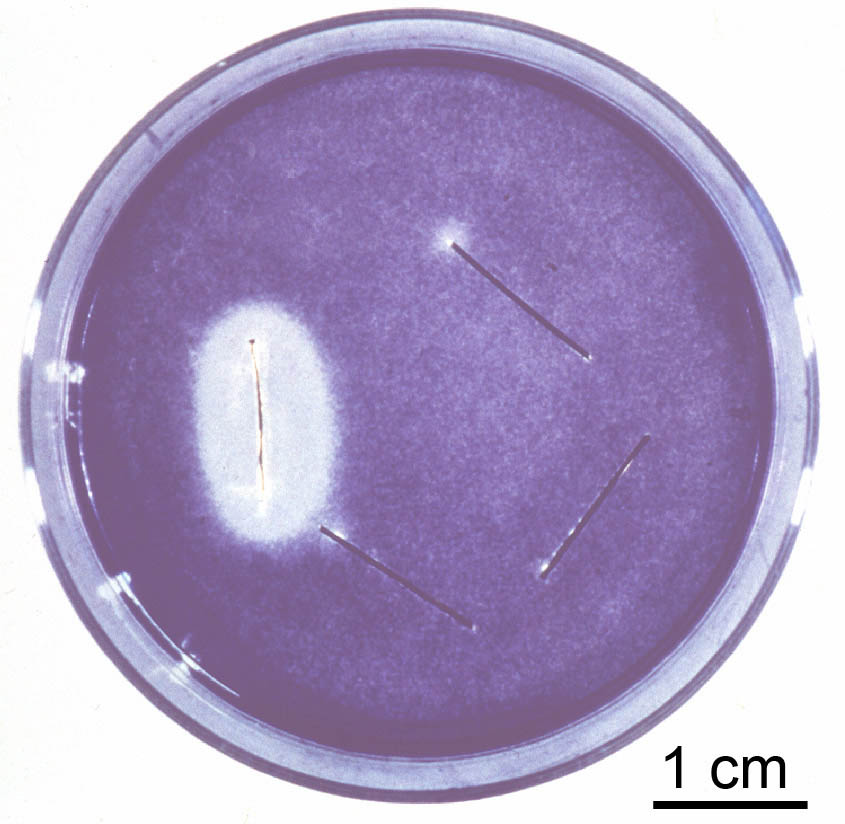
Biologic evaluation of orthodontic wires by agar overlay using epithelial cells

NIOM has for many years contributed to standardization at an international level both through the International organization for Standardization - ISO and within Europe through the Comité Européen de Normalisation (CEN). Development of new standards and revision of existing standards have been the main focus. Standards in dentistry set requirements for the properties of dental materials and dental instrumentation, and prescribe procedures for the testing of dental materials. Participation in standardization work for dental products and for biocompatibility in general allows NIOM to have an influence on test methods and requirements for dental products. NIOM has had, and still has, a major impact on the selection of methodology and requirements of the dental product standards, and the requirements are often based on results from research activities at NIOM.

International standardization is organized in different Technical Committees (TC), each dealing with a specific field of interest. Each committee is again divided into smaller subcommittees and working groups devoted to different topics of the field. Scientists from the institute are technical experts and conveners of working groups within the following technical committees: ISO/TC 106 Dentistry; ISO/TC 194 Biocompatibility of medical devices; CEN/TC 55 Dentistry, and CEN/TC 206 Biocompatibility of medical and dental materials and devices. Standards Norway (SN) is the national member body in the European and International standardization organizations.
