= Hopeite =

Mineral

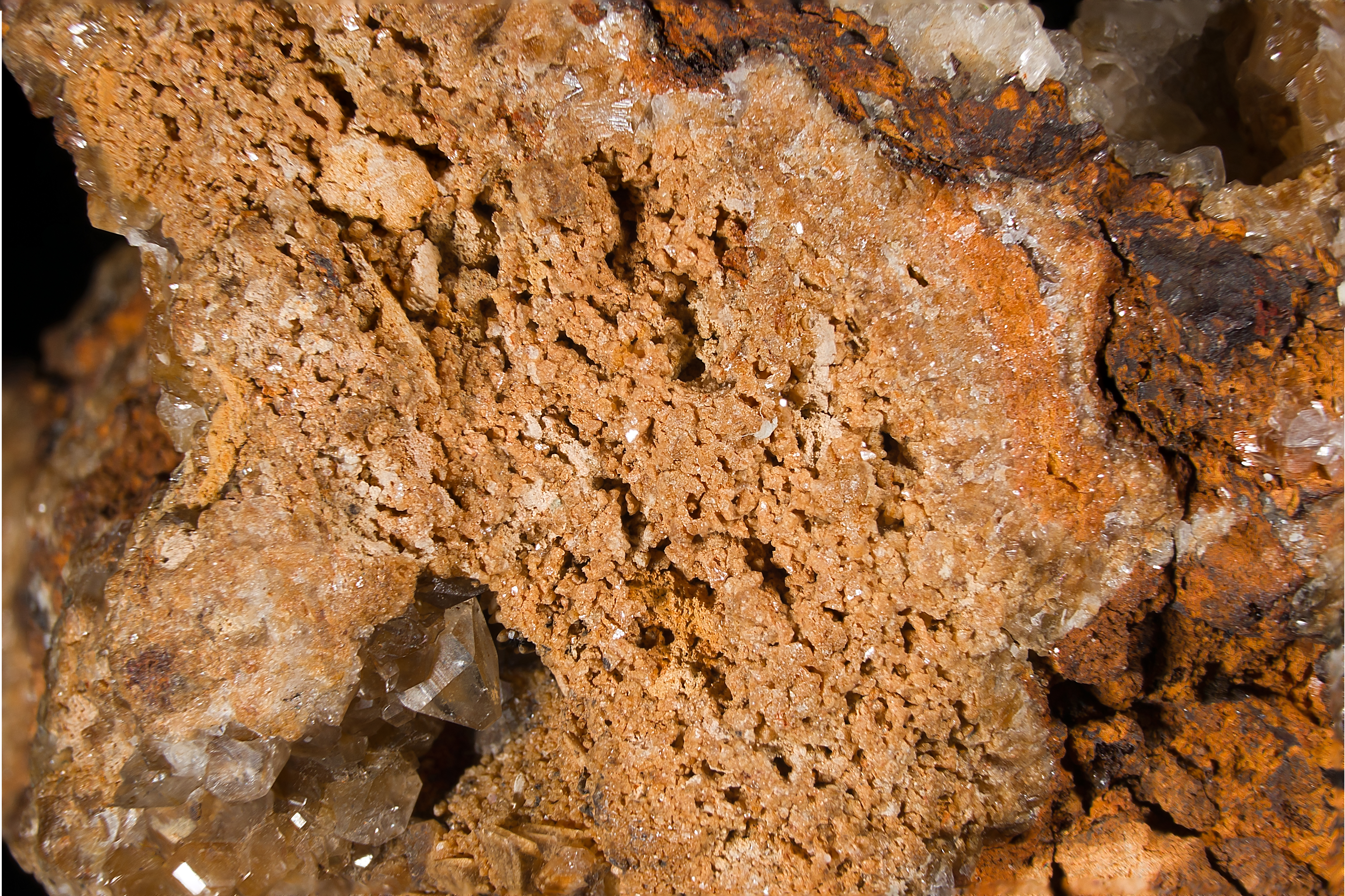
- Hopeite Belgium – Type locality

General
- Category: Phosphate minerals
- Formula: Zn_{3}(PO_{4})_{2}·4H_{2}O
- IMA symbol: Hop
- Strunz classification: 8.CA.30
- Crystal system: Orthorhombic
- Crystal class: Dipyramidal (mmm); H-M symbol: (2/m 2/m 2/m)
- Space group: Pnma

Identification
- Formula mass: 458.17 g/mol
- Color: Colorless, gray white, yellow, white, light yellow
- Crystal habit: Encrustations – Forms crust-like aggregates on matrix. Prismatic – crystals shaped like slender prisms (e.g. tourmaline). Reniform – kidney-like in shape (e.g. hematite).
- Cleavage: [100] Perfect, [010] good, [001] poor
- Fracture: Uneven – flat surfaces (not cleavage) fractured in an uneven pattern
- Mohs scale hardness: 3–3.5
- Luster: Vitreous (glassy)
- Streak: White
- Specific gravity: 3
- Optical properties: Biaxial (−), a = 1.572–1.574, b = 1.582–1.591, g = 1.59–1.592
- Other characteristics: Non-radioactive, non-magnetic

Hopeite is a hydrated zinc phosphate with formula: Zn_{3}(PO_{4})_{2}·4H_{2}O. It is a rare mineral used mainly as a collectors specimen.

Hopeite crystallizes in the orthorhombic system with prismatic, vitreous white to yellow crystals. It also forms druzy encrustations and reniform (kidney-shaped) masses. The related mineral parahopeite, which has the same composition but different crystal structure, is triclinic. The minerals are formed through oxidation of sphalerite by the presence of phosphate-rich solutions.

It was first described in 1822 from Moresnet, Liège Province, Belgium and is named after Scottish chemist, Thomas Charles Hope (1766–1844) of the University of Edinburgh.

It has been found in Zambia associated with lazulite.

Hopeite is one of the two conversion minerals arising from the application of the rust converter 'Fertan'.

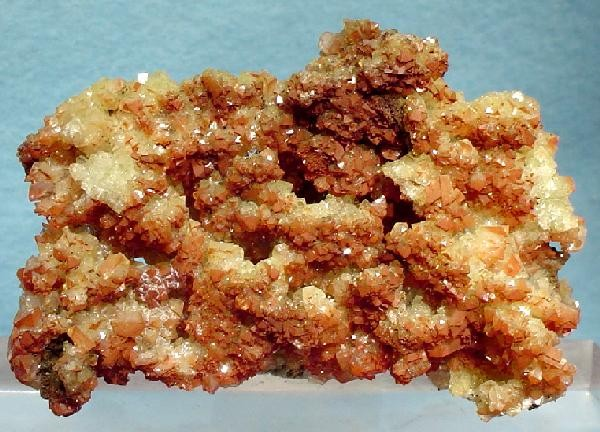
Orange-brown hopeite prisms to 3 mm on a nearly solid matrix of glassy, pastel yellow-green parahopeite crystals. Locality: Kabwe Mine (Broken Hill Mine), Kabwe, Central Province, Zambia. Broken Hill is the type locality for parahopeite.
