= Luting agent =

Dental cement used to connect prosthesis

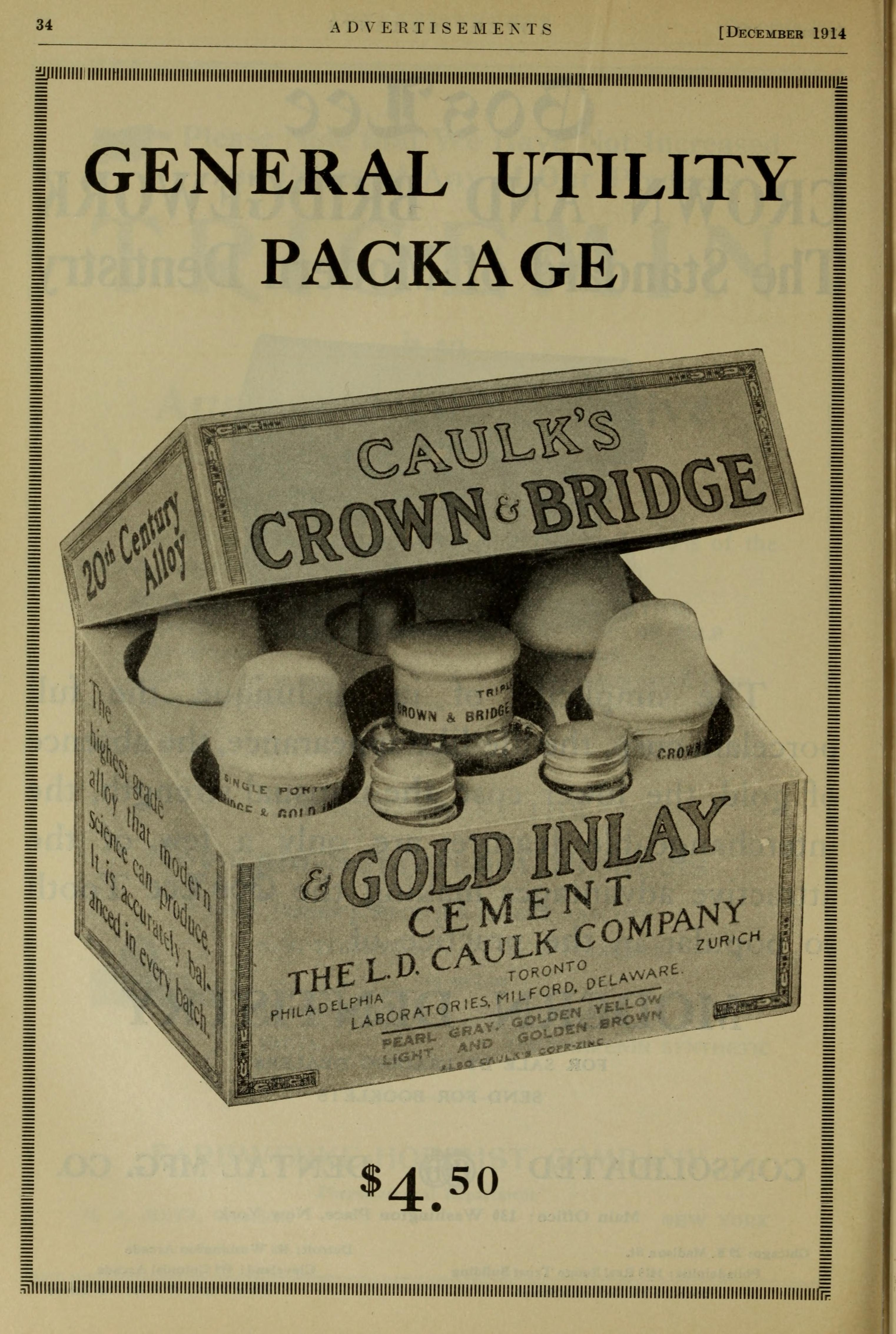
This image taken from the Dental Cosmos shows a box of bottles containing dental cement which was used to lute dental crowns, bridges and inlays. It was produced by the L.D. Caulk Company in the early 1900s.

A luting agent is a dental cement connecting the underlying tooth structure to a fixed prosthesis. To lute means to glue two different structures together. There are two major purposes of luting agents in dentistry – to secure a cast restoration in fixed prosthodontics (e.g. for use of retaining of an inlay, crowns, or bridges), and to keep orthodontic bands and appliances in situ.

In a complex restoration procedure, the selection of an appropriate luting agent is crucial to its long-term success. In addition to preventing the fixed prosthesis from dislodging, it is also a seal, preventing bacteria from penetrating the tooth-restoration interface.

Zinc phosphate is the oldest material available and has been used in dentistry for more than a century. The introduction of adhesive resin systems made a wide range of dental materials available as luting agents. The choice of luting agent is dependent on clinical factors including dental occlusion, tooth preparation, adequate moisture control, core material, supporting tooth structure, tooth location, etc. Research has determined that no single luting agent is ideal for all applications.

== Classification ==
There are many dental luting agents available. Recently introduced agents such as resins and resin-modified glass-ionomer cement (RMGIC) are claimed to perform better clinically than some traditional ones due to their improved properties. Ultimately, the durability of restoration attached to the tooth surface using lutes depends on several factors, for instance strength of materials used, operator's skills, tooth type, and patient's behaviour.

Dental lutes can be classified in many ways, some of which are based on:

(i) user's knowledge and experience of use

- conventional: zinc phosphate, zinc polycarboxylate, and glass-ionomer (GI)
- contemporary: resin-modified glass-ionomer cement (RMGIC) and resin

(ii) type of setting mechanism

- acid-base reaction: zinc phosphate, zinc polycarboxylate, glass-ionomer
- polymerisation: resin-modified glass-ionomer cement (RMGIC) and resin

(iii) the expected duration of use of restoration

- definitive (long term): zinc phosphate, zinc polycarboxylate, glass-ionomer, resin-modified glass-ionomers (RMGIC) and resin
- provisional (short term): eugenol, non-eugenol, resin, or polycarboxylate-based

=== Definitive cements ===
==== Zinc phosphate ====
Zinc phosphate is the luting cement that has been about the longest and has become very firmly established. It is still routinely used by almost one-third of UK practitioners today. It is usually made up of a powder (zinc oxide and magnesium oxide) and a liquid (aqueous phosphoric acid). Mixing of zinc phosphate is done by using a spatula to gradually incorporate the powder into the liquid. By using a chilled glass slab, the working time will be increased.

Clinical studies have been carried out and results show that over a ten-year period, zinc phosphate cemented restorations had a lower risk of failure compared to other conventional cements such as glass ionomer or resin-modified glass ionomer. However, it has some well-known clinical disadvantages, including high clinical solubility, lack of adhesion, low setting pH and a low tensile strength.

==== Zinc polycarboxylate ====
Zinc polycarboxylate was the first cement to bind to tooth structure. It is generally made up of the same powder as zinc phosphate (zinc oxide and up to 10% magnesium oxide) but uses a different liquid – aqueous copolymer of polyacrylic acid (30–40%).

It has a short working time which can make it difficult to use but this can be elongated by adding tartaric acid, mixing on a cold glass slab or using a lower powder–liquid ratio. In comparison with zinc phosphate, zinc polycarboxylate has been found to be distinctly superior in its adhesion to enamel and dentin under tensile loading.

==== Glass ionomer ====
This is the first of the glass ionomer (GI) luting cements to appear in 1978. It consists of fluoroaluminosilicate glass and a liquid containing polyacrylic acid, itaconic acid and water. Alternatively, the acid may be freeze-dried and added to powder with distilled water.

When in position it will release fluoride ions which could have a potential anti-caries effect. It also binds physicochemically to tooth structure and has a low coefficient of thermal expansion, both of which are important to create a good seal and good retention. However, it has been linked with significant postoperative sensitivity. It is also very initially acidic which may cause pulpal inflammation and has a very slow setting reaction, meaning hardening can take up to seven days.

==== Resin cements ====
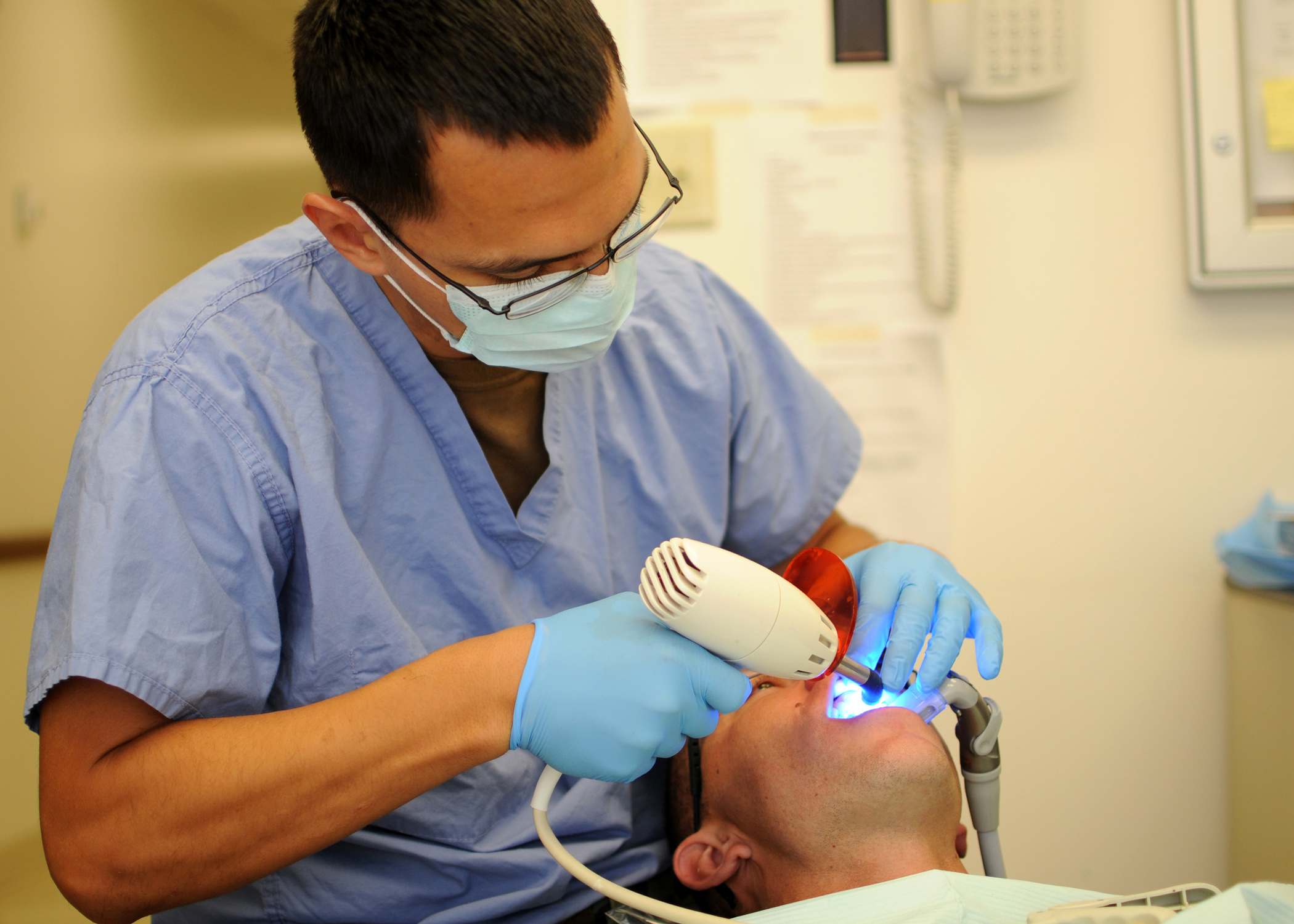
This photo shows an operator using a dental curing light to initiate the setting reaction of the dental cement used.

Resin cements are a type of polymerisable lutes. They consist of methacrylate and dimethacrylate monomers (e.g. bisphenol A-glycidyl methacrylate (Bis-GMA), urethane dimethacrylate (UDMA), tri-ethylene glycol dimethacrylate (TEGMA)), filler particles (e.g. quartz, fused silica, aluminosilicates and borosilicates) and an initiator which can be either chemically- or light-activated.

- Chemically/self-cured resin cements

Autopolymerisation occurs once all the constituents are mixed together. An external source of energy such as light and heat is not needed to activate the setting reaction. Excess cement should be removed immediately after seating the restoration by using interproximal dental instruments such as dental floss. Autopolymerised cement is proven to be the most radiolucent among all resin cements, making it relatively difficult to be seen on radiographs.

- Light-cured resin cements

Due to the presence of light-activated components (photo-initiators), this type of resin cement requires an external light source to initiate the setting reaction. This characteristic allows command set at the periphery of the restoration where light can reach the cement. However, this type of cement is not suitable for thick restorations due to attenuation of light. Instead, a chemically-cured resin cement should be used.

- Dual-cured resin cements

They consist of a light-activated paste mixed with a chemical catalyst for resin polymerisation. They are widely used for luting dental restoration whereby the thickness allows penetration of light for partial curing only. On the other hand, the chemically-cured component is key in ensuring complete polymerisation and hence full strength acquisition. Discolouration may occur due to the presence of aromatic amine. Overall, the combination of its physical and chemical properties makes it the most favourable type.

Today resin cements are manufactured in different shades to accommodate demanding aesthetic needs. It is also well known for its high flexural strength, which ranges from 64 to 97 MPa. Although it has the advantage of attaching restorations with minimal retentive capacity to tooth surfaces due to its high bond strength to dentine, its methacrylate constituent causes it to undergo polymerisation shrinkage when setting. The strain introduced by the shrinkage will tend to raise the tensile stresses significantly at areas where the cement is thick. However, the cement thickness usually used is sufficiently low to raise concern. Another way to look at the strain applied onto the tooth structure is to consider the configuration factor (C-factor) of the lute, especially in the case of inlay type restoration. The use of resin cements is considered technique-sensitive as compared to conventional cements because it requires multiple steps for bonding and is difficult to clean up.

==== Resin-modified glass-ionomer cement (RMGIC) ====
RMGIC, also known as hybrid cements, was developed with the purpose of eliminating weaknesses of the traditional glass-ionomer (GI) to enhance its existing properties. The addition of polymerisable resins (hydrophilic methacrylate monomers) results in higher compressive and tensile strength, as well as lower solubility, all of which are ideal properties of a dental luting agent. The setting reaction takes place with the relatively quick polymerisation of resins and gradual acid-base reaction of GI. At the early stage of setting reaction, RMGIC has a certain degree of solubility at the margins. Therefore, it is important to keep the margin dry for around 10 minutes to minimise loss of marginal cement.

Theoretically, RMGIC benefits the teeth by releasing fluoride at the marginal area to reduce the risk of tooth decay. However, there is currently no clinical evidence to prove this since the cement film is very thin (only 20–30μm) at the margin.

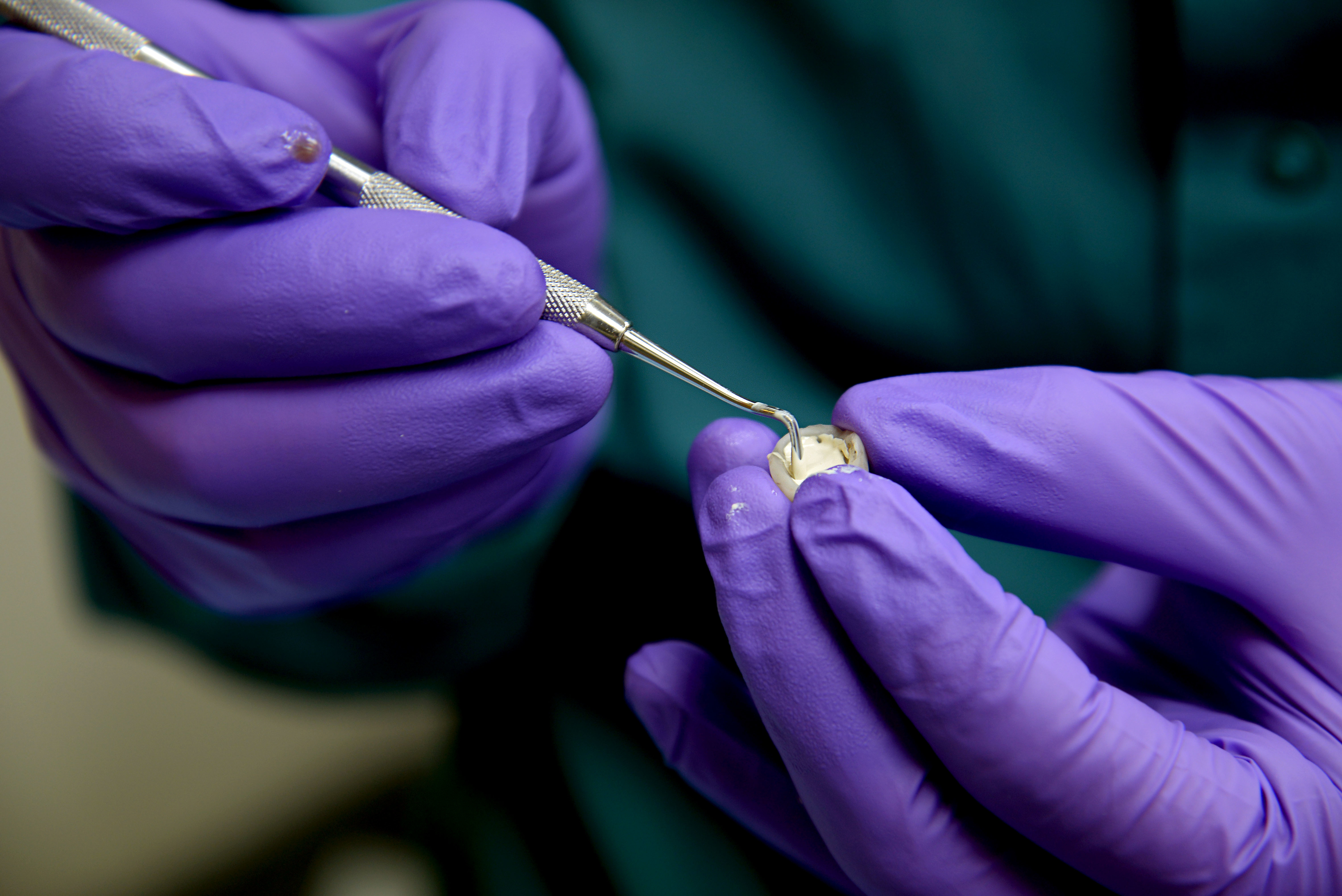
This photo shows the application of luting cement onto a temporary dental crown. The use of lute in this case is therefore considered provisional because of the short duration of use of the crown (up to six weeks). The crown will eventually be replaced by a permanent crown.

=== Provisional or temporary cements ===
Provisional (or temporary) luting agents are used specifically for inter-appointment fixation of temporary restorations, prior to cementation of a permanent restoration. It is mainly provisional crowns and bridges (fixed partial dentures) that are cemented with eugenol-containing temporary cements, but sometimes they may be used for permanent restorations.

As these temporary restorations will require removal, their ideal properties should consist of poor physical properties, such as low tensile strength and high solubility; as well as no pulp irritability and easy handling. The main examples of temporary luting agents include zinc oxide-eugenol cements, non-eugenol-containing zinc oxide cements and calcium hydroxide pastes.

==== Zinc oxide-eugenol ====
Eugenol (4-allyl-2-methoxy phenol) is the principal constituent of clove oil, and when mixed with zinc oxide leads to a chelating reaction. All eugenol reacts to zinc oxide eugenol, meaning none is available to diffuse once setting is complete. Supposedly its therapeutic effects are supported by dentinal tubule fluid promoting the release of eugenol and its penetration towards the pulp.

Zinc oxide-eugenol is often found as a two-paste material when used for temporary cementation. The paste containing zinc oxide often includes mineral or vegetable oils, and the eugenol has fillers incorporated into it to form the other paste.

Zinc oxide-eugenol may present as a powder (zinc oxide) that requires mixing with a liquid (eugenol). The zinc oxide powder may contain up to 8% of other zinc salts (acetate, propionate, or succinate) as accelerators. The liquid containing eugenol has up to 2% of acetic acid added as an accelerator.

==== Zinc oxide non-eugenol ====
If cementation of a definitive restoration would require a resin-based luting agent, there is evidence indicating the use of a zinc oxide non-eugenol containing cement. Non-eugenol materials use long-chain aliphatic acids or aryl-substituted butyric acid to react with zinc oxide particles. Eugenol itself is known to be incompatible with resin polymers, as it is a radical scavenger (like other phenolic compounds) and therefore inhibits polymerisation of resin materials.

Further evidence illustrated that the application of eugenol-containing cement to cured composite resin cores before final cementation with resin cement significantly reduced retention of the crowns. It is also worth bearing in mind that a temporary cement's incomplete removal from a cured resin composite core may affect the final restoration's cementation quality.

== Clinical applications ==
Cements can either be permanent (called definitive) or temporary (called provisional):

=== Definitive cements ===
==== Zinc phosphate ====
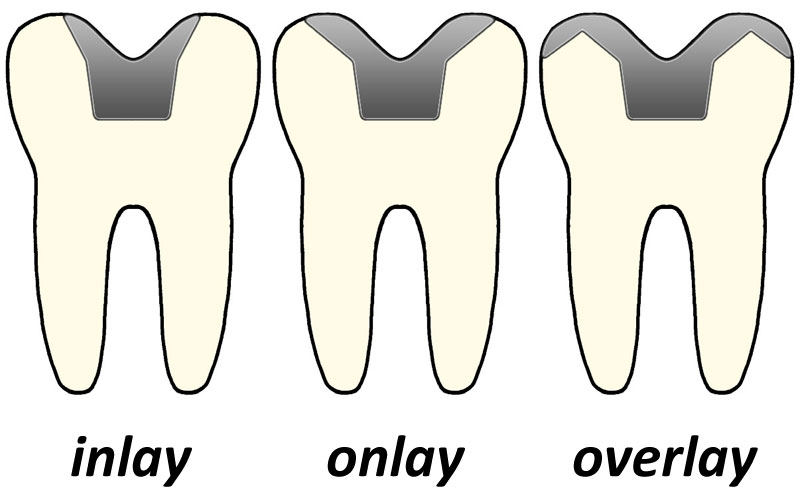
This image shows the different types of indirect restorations mentioned in the clinical application section. The ideal luting agent is chosen depending on the type of materials used to fabricate the restoration.

- Zinc phosphate is used to place metal constructed restorations which are mechanically retentive. The material is also suitable for cementing prefabricated or cast metal post-cores. It can also be used to lute long span bridges.
- The use of zinc phosphate in luting a porcelain crown may result in decreased aesthetic properties due to the high concentrations of unreacted zinc oxide, especially if the cement lute margin is visible. To avoid this, the crown margins should be kept within gingival crevice, so that the cement lute remains hidden.

==== Zinc polycarboxylate ====
- This material is mainly used in attaching crowns and inlays. Due to masticatory forces causing deformation, it can only be used in short-span bridges. Zinc polycarboxylate is adherent to tooth structure such as enamel and dentine, but has weak or no bond with gold and porcelain. This presents limited use when it comes to luting gold or porcelain crowns. However, zinc polycarboxylate bonds to non-precious metal alloys that have been increasingly used in porcelain fused to metal (PFM) crowns.
- Zinc polycarboxylate bonds well with stainless steel, and this makes it useful for the attachment of orthodontic bands.
- As a result of a high concentration of unreacted zinc oxide cores, zinc polycarboxylate sets opaque. If used in porcelain crowns, this will degrade the aesthetic properties of the restoration if the cement lute is left visible.

==== Glass ionomer ====
- Glass ionomer cement when combined with retentive preparations produced a high retentive strength when used as a cement for metal copings to uremic teeth.
- Glass ionomer cements can be used with metal and metal-ceramic restorations provided they possess adequate retentive and resistance form. They are however, contraindicated for all-ceramic restorations that are low-strength.
- It is also suitable for use in amalgam restorations, due to its ability to withstand amalgam condensation. It has been said that GI cements can give more rigid support compared to calcium hydroxide cements, making it popular as a lining material.
- Glass ionomer has an aesthetic advantage over zinc phosphate and zinc polycarboxylate when it comes to luting porcelain crowns. This is because of the presence of unreacted cores of glass rather than zinc oxide, therefore making it more translucent. However, improvements are still required to achieve a true match to porcelain.
- Glass ionomer has not been recommended for cementing posts, as the vibration caused by tooth preparation may decrease the retention provided by the cement.
- In orthodontics, glass ionomer cements are widely used to attach orthodontic bands. The presence of an adhesive seal between the cement and tooth structure additional to fluoride release can help to maintain teeth in good condition throughout orthodontic treatment. However, in practice, the high rate of brackets debonding during treatment has shown that glass ionomer is not a suitable material in this aspect.

==== Resin modified glass ionomer ====
- RMGIC has demonstrated a successful history when used for both metal and metal ceramic restorations The cement also demonstrated good results with metal and composite fibre posts. However, they do not provide adequate retention when used on tooth preparations with poor retention and resistance forms.
- Due to the possibility of hygroscopic expansion, these cements are not recommended for use with all-ceramic restorations that are susceptible to etching and with posts.
- Similar to glass ionomer cement, RMGIC can also be used to provide a high retentive strength when used in cementation of metal copings on uremic teeth with retentive preparations.

==== Resin ====
- Resin cements are widely selected for luting non-metallic restorations, resin bonded bridges, ceramic crowns and porcelain veneers. They are available in a different number of shades, viscosities and aesthetic try-in pastes. These cements are also an option for use with ceramic and resin composite inlays and onlays.
- They also demonstrated a favourable outcome when used for all-ceramic restorations, veneers, metal or metal-ceramic restorations with compromised retention and resistance form.
- Resin cement is also shown to be useful for cementation of post in endodontically treated teeth.

==== Self-adhesive cements ====
- Self-adhesive cements do not require intermediate steps to bond tooth structure, unlike resin cements. This gives simplicity and efficiency in its use. They are dual-cured and are most effective when bonded to dentine. It is suitable for cementing all-ceramic crowns, porcelain inlays and onlays.
- Self-adhesive resin cements has shown an acceptable clinical result when used for ceramic inlays.
- Self-adhesive resin cements also demonstrated high and adequate survival rates when used as a cement for metal ceramic crowns making it a feasible alternative.

=== Provisional cements ===
==== Zinc oxide eugenol ====
- Zinc oxide eugenol is used for luting temporary restorations due to its good sealing abilities but inferior physical properties.
- Eugenol-containing cements should be used with caution as the eugenol can contaminate the preparation by inhibiting the polymerization of certain resin based composites which are used as a definitive filling material. They also reduce the bond strength of both total and self-etching adhesive systems to dentin if used before an indirect bonding restoration.
- Another report shows that there is no difference in bond strengths of self-adhesive resin cements to dentine between prior application of eugenol free and eugenol containing provisional cements.
- Later publications show a reduction in luting agent bond strengths to dentine when eugenol containing provisional cements are used. Nevertheless, contamination of dentine which interference with adhesion of definitive luting agent is inevitable when a provisional cement is used regardless of whether the cement contains eugenol or not.

Selection of luting agent to be used for a given restoration should be based on a basic knowledge of the materials available, the type of restoration to be placed, the requirements of the patient and the expertise and experience of the clinician.

== Summary properties of cements ==
	Type of luting agents	Examples	Constituents	Properties	Advantages	Disadvantages
Definitive cements	Zinc phosphate cements	Fleck's Zinc Phosphate Cement (Mizzy, Cherry Hill, NJ, USA)	Zinc oxide powder + magnesium oxide (2-10%) + phosphoric acid (45-64%)	Non-adhesive solely mechanical retention; Acidic; Reasonable working time	High early strength; Good compressive strength	Irritant to pulp (low pH); High solubility (very soluble in its non-matured state); Low tensile strength (brittle)
Definitive cements	Polycarboxylate cements	Poly F Plus (Dentsply)	Zinc oxide powder + polyacrylic acid (30-40%)	Pseudoplastic; Antibacterial properties; Adhesive to enamel, dentine, some metals	Higher tensile strength; Less irritant to pulp (low pH but less penetration to pulp due to high molecular weight; Adequate resistance to water dissolution	Short working time; Low compressive strength; Not resistant to acid dissolution
Definitive cements	Glass polyalkenoate cements	Aquacem (Dentsply)	Fluoroaluminosilicate glass + acrylic acid or of a maleic/acrylic acid copolymer +Tartaric acid	High early solubility	Coefficient of thermal expansion similar to tooth; Cariostatic potential (fluoride release); Translucent (can be used for porcelain crowns)	Tooth sensitivity after restoration delivery; Susceptible to moisture contamination during 1st few hours of placement
Definitive cements	Resin modified glass polyalkenoate cements and compomers	RelyX Luting Cement (3M ESPE) Kromoglass 2 (Lascod) Kromoglass 3 (Lascod)	Glass ionomer + resin monomer	Improved biocompatibility; Cariostatic potential (fluoride release)	Compressive strength, diametral tensile strength and flexural strength improved compared to zinc phosphate/zinc polycarboxylate/glass ionomer but less than composites; Easy manipulation and use; Fluoride release as GIC; Reduced solubility as compared to GIC; High bond strength to moist dentine	Hygroscopic expansion, so avoid under conventional all ceramic crowns
Definitive cements	Chemically adhesive resin luting cements	Panavia F (Kuraray Dental); RelyX ARC (3M ESPE)	Derive from resin composites with the active constituent being either 4-META (4-methacryloxyethyl trimellitate anhydride) or MDP (10- methacryloyloxydecyldihydrogenphosphate)	Adhesively bonded to metal-based restorations		Difficult to retrieve metal-based crowns cemented
Definitive cements	Resin luting cements	RelyX Unicem		Adhesive luting with ceramic restorations; Self-adhesive (etch and bond)	High compressive; Tensile strength; Low solubility; Good aesthetic properties	Does not bond chemically to metal; Difficult excess removal of cement; Technique sensitive
Provisional cements	Zinc oxide eugenol provisional cement	TempBond (Kerr)	Two-paste material (eugenol, zinc oxide)	setting time reduces with increase with temperature	good sealing ability	low tensile strength/compressive strength/solubility; eugenol interferes with polymerisation of resin composite
Provisional cements	Zinc oxide non-eugenol provisional cement	Temp-Bond NE™	Long chain aliphatic acids/aryl-substituted butyric acid, zinc oxide particles		satisfactorily seal and retain well-fitting provisional restorations	toxic if placed near pulp tissue
Provisional cements	Resin provisional (very little independent research has been conducted)	TempBond Clear (Kerr); Sensitemp (Sultan, Hackensack, NJ, USA); Temporary Resin Cement (Mizzy, Cherry Hill, NJ, USA)				
