= Spatial =

Spatial may refer to:

- Dimension
- Space
- Three-dimensional space
- Spatial (platform)
