= Dental cement =

Materials used to bond teeth or materials to teeth

Dental cements have a wide range of dental and orthodontic applications. Common uses include temporary restoration of teeth, cavity linings to provide pulpal protection, sedation or insulation, and cementing fixed prosthodontic appliances. Recent uses of dental cement also include two-photon calcium imaging of neuronal activity in the brains of animal models in basic experimental neuroscience.

Traditionally, cements have separate powder and liquid components which are manually mixed. Thus, working time, amount and consistency can be individually adapted to the task at hand. Some cements, such as glass ionomer cement (GIC), can be found in capsules and are mechanically mixed using rotating or oscillating mixing machines. Resin cements are not cements in a narrow sense, but rather polymer-based composite materials. ISO 4049: 2019 classifies these polymer-based luting materials according to curing mode as class 1 (self-cured), class 2 (light-cured), or class 3 (dual-cured). Most commercially available products are class 3 materials, combining chemical- and light-activation mechanisms.

== Ideal cement properties ==
- High biocompatibility – zinc phosphate cement is considered the most biocompatible material with a low allergy potential despite the occasional initial acid pain (as a consequence of inadequate powder/liquid ratio)
- Non-irritant – polycarboxylate cement is considered the most sensitive type due to the properties of polyacrylic acid (PAA).
- Antibacterial properties to prevent secondary caries
- Provide a good marginal (bacteria-tight) seal to prevent marginal leakage
- Resistant to dissolution in saliva, or other oral fluid – a primary cause of decementation is the dissolution of the cement at the margins of a restoration
- High strength in tension, shear and compression to resist stress at the restoration–tooth interface.
- High compressive strength (minimum 50 microns acc. to ISO 9917-1)
- Adequate working and setting time
- Good aesthetics
- Good thermal insulation properties as a liner under metal restorations
- Opacity – for diagnostic purposes on radiographs.
- Low film thickness (maximum 25 microns acc. to ISO 9917-1).
- Low allergy potential
- Low shrinkage
- Retention – if an adhesive bond forms between the cement and the restorative material, retention is greatly enhanced. Otherwise, the retention depends on the geometry of the tooth preparation.

Comparison of cements
Cement type	Brands (Manufacturer)	Indications	Contra-indications	Advantages	Disadvantages
Zinc phosphate	DeTrey Zinc (Dentsply); Hoffmann's (Hoffmann Dental Manufaktur); Hy-Bond Zinc (Shofu Dental); Modern Tenacin (L.D. Caulk); Zinc Cement Improved (Mission White Dental)	Lining for all filling materials (amalgam, composites); Cementation of inlays, onlays, crowns and bridges made of precious metal, non-precious metal as well as metal ceramic and all-ceramic (zirconium oxide, aluminium oxide and lithium disilicate ceramic); Cementation of implant-supported crowns and bridges; Cementation of orthodontic bands; Cementation of retention pins and screws; Core build-ups; Long-term temporary fillings; Fillings in deciduous teeth	Direct pulp-capping; Indirect pulp-capping only if pretreated with copal varnish; Cementation of all-ceramic restorations – with compressive strength below 200 MPa; Inadequate retention form of tooth preparation; Luting of veneers	Antibacterial action (initially as strong as penicillin); High biocompatibility Highest elastic modulus; Hypoallergenic; High compressive Strength; Dimensionally stable; Opaque; Longest clinical experience (over a century); Low film thickness; Low cost; Pure micro-mechanic adhesion	Possible initial acid pain; No chemical adhesion; Low tensile strength; Exothermic during mixing; High solubility (in oral fluids)
Zinc polycarboxylate	Aqua CC (Hoffmann Dental Manufaktur); Durelon (3M Espe); Hy-Bond (Shofu Dental); Tylok Plus (L.D. Caulk)	Porcelain restorations; Orthodontic bands; Cavity liner; Metal crowns; Metal-ceramic crowns	Titanium-based restorations (cement discolouration occurs)	Low irritation/ post-op sensitivity; Adhesive to tooth structure; Sufficient compressive strength; Higher tensile strength than zinc phosphate; Expands minimally, can thus compensate for polymerisation shrinkage under composite fillings	Low pH initially; Low resistance to erosion in acidic environment; No acid pain; Short working time
Glass ionomer (GI)	Fuji I (GC America); Ketac-Cem (3M/Espe)	Metal and metal-ceramic restorations; Porcelain restorations; All-ceramic crowns with high strength cores such as alumina or zirconia; Orthodontic bands; Cavity liners; Restoring erosion lesions	Allergy (rare); Dentine close to pulp (place suitable liner first)	Chemical adhesion to tooth and metal restoration; Fluoride release; Ease of mixing; Good flow; Aesthetic; Thermal compatible with enamel; Low shrinkage; Good resistance to acid dissolution; Translucency	Soluble in water; Rapid set – time limitation especially in cementation of several units; Moisture sensitivity at set; Fluoride release; Inherent opacity; Low fracture toughness; Poor wear resistance; Radiolucency; Possible pulpal sensitivity
Resin modified glass ionomer (RMGI)	Fuji Plus (GC America); Vitremer Luting (3M/Espe); Advance (L.D. Caulk); Rely X Luting	Cavity liners; Core buildups; Luting cements; Crowns; Orthodontic appliances	All-ceramic crowns – due to uptake of water causing swelling and pressure on the crown; Veneer – not retentive enough	Dual cure; Fluoride release; Higher flexural strength than GI; Capable of bonding to composite materials	Setting expansion may lead to cracking of all-ceramic crowns; Moisture-sensitive
Zinc oxide eugenol (ZOE)	Temp-Bond; Fynal (L.D. Caulk); Super EBA (Bosworth)	Temporary crowns, bridges; Provisional cementation of fixed partial dentures; Provisional restoration of teeth; Cavity liner	When resin cement to be used for permanent cementation	Neutral pH; Good sealing ability; Resistance to marginal penetration; Obtundent effect on pulpal tissues	Weakest of the cements; Low strength; Low abrasion resistance; Soluble (in oral fluids); Little anticariogenic action
Copper cements	Doc's Best (Temrex); READY2PROTECT Copperioncement (Hoffmann Dental Manufaktur)	Indirect pulp capping in combination with Copal Varnish; Minimal invasive caries treatment with modified ART technique; Fillings in deciduous teeth; Long-term temporary fillings, Lining for all filling materials (polymer-based and amalgam); Core build-ups		Bactericidal effect; Bacteria-tight seal	
Resin cements	Panavia 21 (Kurarary); Multilink Automix SG(Vivadent); RelyX Unicem 2 (3M/ESPE); Maxcem Elite (Kerr); TheraCEM (BISCO)	All crown types; Bonding fixed partial dentures; Inlays; Veneers; Indirect resin restorations; Resin-fiber posts	If a ZOE cement has been used for the previous temporary; Light cured under a metal crown since it would not cure through the metal	Strongest of the cement – highest tensile strength.; Least soluble (in oral fluids); High micromechanical bonding to prepared enamel, dentin, alloys, and ceramic surfaces; Neutral pH	Setting shrinkage – contributing to marginal leakage; Difficult sealing; Requires a meticulous and critical technique; Possible pulpal sensitivity; Difficult to remove excess cement

== Cements based on phosphoric acid ==
Types	Composition	Setting reaction
Zinc phosphate cements	Usually a powder (zinc oxide with other metallic oxides, e.g. magnesium oxide) and liquid (aqueous solution of phosphoric acid); Zinc oxide or aluminium oxide buffer (up to 10%)	3ZnO + 2H_{3}PO_{4} +H_{2}O →Zn_{3}(PO_{4})_{2} = 4H_{2}O
Silicophosphate cements (obsolete)	Supplied as a powder (zinc oxide and aluminosilicate glass mixture) and liquid (aqueous solution of phosphoric acid with buffers)	Forms unconsumed cores of zinc oxide and glass particles enclosed by matrix of zinc and aluminium phosphates.
Copper cements	Supplied as a powder (zinc oxide and copperions) and liquid (aqueous solution of phosphoric acid)	Same as zinc phosphate

== Dental cements based on organometallic chelate compounds ==
Types	Composition	Setting reaction	Advantages	Disadvantages	Applications
Zinc oxide/eugenol cements	Supplied as two pastes or as a powder (zinc oxide) and liquid (zinc acetate, eugenol, olive oil)	A slow chelation reaction of two eugenol molecules and one zinc ion to form zinc eugenolate without moisture. However, setting can be completed fast when water is present.	Bactericidal effect due to free eugenol	Pulpal damage due to production of exotoxins; High solubility in water; Interferes with polymerisation process and leads to discoloration	Mainly used for lining under amalgam restorations
Ortho-ethoxybenzoic acid (EBA) cements	Supplied as a powder (mainly zinc oxide and reinforcing agents: quartz and hydrogenated rosin and liquid o-ethoxybenzoic acid and eugenol)	Similar to zinc oxide/eugenol materials	Higher powder/liquid ratio can be achieved, so the set material can be strong; Lower solubility than zinc oxide/eugenol products	Less retention than zinc phosphate cements	Luting cements primarily
Calcium hydroxide cements	Calcium hydroxide in water (water can be substitute by a solution of methyl cellulose in water or a synthetic polymer in volatile organic solvent); Calcium hydroxide is usually supplied as two pastes	Chelate compounds are formed and chelation is largely due to zinc ions	Antibacterial properties; Induces formation of secondary dentine layer	Setting may be slow due to low viscosity; Exothermic setting reaction; Relatively low compressive strength	Used as lining material under silicate and resin-based filling materials

== Dental applications ==
Dental cements can be utilised in a variety of ways depending on the composition and mixture of the material. The following categories outline the main uses of cements in dental procedures.

=== Temporary restorations ===
Unlike composite and amalgam restorations, cements are usually used as a temporary restorative material. This is generally due to their reduced mechanical properties, which may not withstand long-term occlusal load.

- Glass ionomer cement (GIC)
- Zinc polycarboxylate cement
- Zinc oxide eugenol cement
- Resin-modified glass ionomer cement (RMGIC)

=== Bonded amalgam restorations ===
Amalgam does not bond to tooth tissue and therefore requires mechanical retention in the form of undercuts, slots and grooves. However, if insufficient tooth tissue remains after cavity preparation to provide such retentive features, a cement can be utilised to help retain the amalgam in the cavity.

Historically, zinc phosphate and polycarboxylate cements were used for this technique; however, since the mid-1980s, composite resins have been the material of choice due to their adhesive properties. Common resin cements utilised for bonded amalgams are RMGIC and dual-cure resin-based composite.

=== Liners and pulp protection ===
When a cavity reaches close proximity to the pulp chamber, it is advisable to protect the pulp from further insult by placing a base or liner as a means of insulation from the definitive restoration. Cements indicated for liners and bases include:

- Zinc oxide eugenol
- Zinc polycaroxylate
- Resin-modified glass ionomer cement (RMGIC)

Pulp capping is a method to protect the pulp chamber if the clinician suspects it may have been exposed by caries or cavity preparation. Indirect pulp caps are indicated for suspected micro-exposures, whereas direct pulp caps are placed on a visibly exposed pulp. To encourage pulpal recovery, it is essential to use a sedative, non-cytotoxic material such as setting calcium hydroxide cement.

=== Luting cements ===
Luting materials are used to cement fixed prosthodontics such as crowns and bridges. Luting cements are often of similar composition to restorative cements; however, they typically have less filler, resulting in a less viscous cement.

- Resin-modified glass ionomer cement (RMGIC)
- Glass ionomer cement (GIC)
- Zinc polycarboxylate cement
- Zinc oxide eugenol luting cement

=== Summary of clinical applications ===
Clinical application	Type of cement used
Crowns
Metal	Zinc phosphate, GI, RMGI, self or dual cured resin *
Metal ceramic	Zinc phosphate, GI, RMGI, self or dual cured resin *
All ceramic	Resin cement
Temporary crown	Zinc oxide eugenol cement
3/4 crown	Zinc phosphate, GI, RMGI, self or dual cured resin *
Bridges
Conventional	Zinc phosphate, GI, RMGI, self or dual cured resin *
Resin bonded	Resin cement
Temporary bridge	Zinc oxide eugenol cement
Veneers	Resin cement
Inlay	Zinc phosphate, GI, RMGI, self or dual cured resin *
Onlay	Zinc phosphate, GI, RMGI, self or dual cured resin *
Post and core
Metal post	Any cement which is non-adhesive (NOT resin cements)
Fibre post	Resin cement
Orthodontic brackets	Resin cement
Orthodontic molar bands	GI, zinc polycarboxylate, composite

== Composition and classification ==
=== ISO classification ===
Cements are classified based on their components. Generally, they can be classified into categories:

- Water-based acid-base cements: zinc phosphate (Zn_{3}(PO_{4})_{2}), zinc polyacrylate (polycarboxylate), glass ionomer (GIC). These contain metal oxide or silicate fillers embedded in a salt matrix.
- Non-aqueous/oil-based acid-base cements: zinc oxide eugenol and non-eugenol zinc oxide. These contain metal oxide fillers embedded in a metal salt matrix.
- Resin-based: acrylate or methacrylate resin cements, including the latest generation of self-adhesive resin cements that contain silicate or other types of fillers in an organic resin matrix.

Cements can be classified based on the type of their matrix:

- Phosphate (zinc phosphate, silicophosphate)
- Polycarboxylate (zinc polycarboxylate, glass ionomer)
- Phenolate (zinc oxide, eugenol, and ethoxybenzoic acid [EBA])
- Resin (polymeric)

Based on time of use:

- Conventional (zinc phosphate, zinc polycarboxylate, zinc oxide eugenol, glass ionomer cement)
- Contemporary (resin cements, resin-modified glass ionomers).

== Resin-based cements ==
These cements are resin-based composites. They are commonly used to definitively cement indirect restorations, especially resin-bonded bridges and ceramic or indirect composite restorations, to the tooth tissue. They are usually used in conjunction with a bonding agent, as they cannot bond directly to the tooth; however, some products can be applied directly to the tooth (self-etching products).

There are three main resin-based cements:

- Light-cured – required a curing lamp to complete the set
- Dual-cured – can be light cured at the restoration margins but chemically cured in areas that the curing lamp cannot penetrate
- Self-etch – these etch the tooth surface and do not require an intermediate bonding agent

Resin cements are available in a range of shades to enhance aesthetics.

=== Mechanical properties ===
1. Fracture toughness
  - Thermocycling significantly reduces the fracture toughness of all resin-based cements except RelyX Unicem 2 AND G-CEM LinkAce.
2. Compressive strength
  - All automixed resin-based cements have greater compressive strength than their hand-mixed counterpart, except for Variolink II.

== Zinc polycarboxylate cements ==
Zinc polycarboxylate was invented in 1968 and was revolutionary as it was the first cement to exhibit the ability to bond to the tooth surface chemically. Very little pulpal irritation is seen with its use due to the large size of the polyacrylic acid molecule. This cement is commonly used for the installation of crowns, bridges, inlays, onlays, and orthodontic appliances.

Composition:

- Powder + liquid reaction
- Zinc oxide (powder) + poly(acrylic) acid (liquid) = Zinc polycarboxylate
- Zinc polycarboxylate is also sometimes referred to as zinc polyacrylate or zinc polyalkenoate
- Components of the powder include zinc oxide, stannous fluoride, magnesium oxide, silica and alumina
- Components of the liquid include poly(acrylic) acid, itaconic acid, and maleic acid.

Adhesion:

- Zinc polycarboxylate cements adhere to enamel and dentine using a chelation reaction.

Indications for use:

- Temporary restorations
- Inflamed pulp
- Bases
- Cementation of crowns

Advantages	Disadvantages
Bonds to tooth tissue or restorative material	Difficult to mix
Long term durability	Opaque
Acceptable mechanical properties	Soluble in mouth particularly where stannous fluoride is incorporated in the powder
Relatively inexpensive	Difficult to manipulate
Long and successful track record	ill-defined set

== Zinc phosphate cements ==
Zinc phosphate was the first dental cement to appear on the dental marketplace and is considered the “standard” for other dental cements to be compared to. The many uses of this cement include permanent cementation of crowns, orthodontic appliances, intraoral splints, inlays, post systems, and fixed partial dentures. Zinc phosphate exhibits a very high compressive strength, an average tensile strength and an appropriate film thickness when applied according to the manufacturer's guidelines. However, issues with the clinical use of zinc phosphate are its initially low pH when applied in an oral environment (linked to pulpal irritation) and the cement's inability to chemically bond to the tooth surface, although this has not affected the successful long-term use of the material.

Composition:

- Phosphoric acid liquid
- Zinc oxide powder

Formerly known as the most commonly used luting agent, zinc phosphate cement works successfully for permanent cementation. It does not possess anticariogenic effects, is not adherent to tooth structure, and acquires a moderate degree of intraoral solubility. However, zinc phosphate cement can irritate the nerve pulp; hence, pulp protection is required. The use of polycarboxylate cement (zinc polycarboxylate or glass ionomer) is highly recommended, as it is a more biologically compatible cement.

== Known contraindications of dental cements ==
Dental materials such as fillings and orthodontic instruments must satisfy biocompatibility requirements as they will be in the oral cavity for a prolonged period. Some dental cements can contain chemicals that may induce allergic reactions in various tissues in the oral cavity. Common allergic reactions include stomatitis/dermatitis, urticaria, swelling, rash and rhinorrhea. These may predispose to life-threatening conditions such as anaphylaxis, oedema and cardiac arrhythmias.

Eugenol is widely used in dentistry for different applications, including impression pastes, periodontal dressings, cements, filling materials, endodontic sealers, and dry socket dressings. Zinc oxide eugenol is a cement commonly used for provisional restorations and root canal obturation. Although classified as non-cariogenic by the US Food and Drug Administration, eugenol is proven to be cytotoxic, with the risk of anaphylactic reactions in certain patients.

Zinc oxide eugenol is a mixture of zinc oxide and eugenol that forms a polymerised eugenol cement. The setting reaction produces an end product called zinc eugenolate, which readily hydrolyses, producing free eugenol that causes adverse effects on fibroblast and osteoclast-like cells. At high concentrations, localised necrosis and reduced healing occur, whereas for low concentrations, contact dermatitis is the common clinical manifestation.

Allergy contact dermatitis has been proven to be the highest clinical occurrence, usually localised to soft tissues, with buccal mucosa being the most prevalent. Normally, a patch test done by dermatologists will be used to diagnose the condition. Glass ionomer cements have been used to substitute zinc oxide eugenol cements (thus removing the allergen), with positive outcomes from patients.
