= Antiparallel =

The term antiparallel may refer to:

- Antiparallel (biochemistry), the orientation of adjacent molecules
- Antiparallel lines, a congruent but opposite relative orientation of two lines in relation to another line or angle
- Antiparallel vectors, a pair of vectors pointed in opposite directions
- Antiparallel (electronics), the polarity of devices run in parallel

== See also ==
- Antiparallelogram
