= Zinc oxide eugenol =

Dental cement material

Zinc oxide eugenol (ZOE) is a material created by the combination of zinc oxide and eugenol contained in clove oil. An acid–base reaction takes place with the formation of zinc eugenolate chelate. The reaction is catalysed by water and is accelerated by the presence of metal salts. ZOE can be used as a dental filling material or dental cement in dentistry. It is often used in dentistry when the decay is very deep or very close to the nerve or pulp chamber. Because the tissue inside the tooth, i.e. the pulp, reacts badly to the drilling stimulus (heat and vibration), it frequently becomes severely inflamed and precipitates a condition called acute or chronic pulpitis. This condition usually leads to severe chronic tooth sensitivity or actual toothache and can then only be treated with the removal of the nerve (pulp) called root canal therapy. For persons with a dry socket as a complication of tooth extraction, packing the dry socket with a eugenol-zinc oxide paste on iodoform gauze is effective for reducing acute pain. The placement of a ZOE "temporary" for a few to several days prior to the placement of the final filling can help to sedate the pulp. But, ZOE had in vitro cytotoxicity majorly due to release of Zn ions, not eugenol. In spite of severe in vitro cytotoxicity, ZOE showed relatively good biocompatibility in animal study when ZOE was applied on dentin. When ZOE was used as dentin-protective based materials, use of dental composite resin on ZOE was strongly prevented due to its inhibition of resin polymerization through radical scavenging effect. It is classified as an intermediate restorative material and has anaesthetic and antibacterial properties. The exact mechanism of anesthetic effect from ZOE was not revealed perfectly, but possibly through anti-inflammatory effect, modulating immune cells to less inflamed status.

It is sometimes used in the management of dental caries as a "temporary filling". ZOE cements were introduced in the 1890s.

Zinc oxide eugenol is also used as an impression material during construction of complete dentures and is used in the mucostatic technique of taking impressions, usually in a special tray, (acrylic) produced after primary alginate impressions. However, ZOE is not usually used if the patient has large undercuts or tuberosities, whereby silicone impression materials would be better suited.

Zinc oxide eugenol is also used as an antimicrobial additive in paint.

== Types ==
According to ANSI/ADA Specification no:30 (ISO 3107) and depending on intended use and individual formulation designed for each specific purpose.

== Composition ==
The chemical composition of ZOE is typically:

- Zinc oxide, ~69.0%
- White (bleached) rosin, ~29.3%
- Zinc acetate, ~1.0% (improves strength)
- Zinc stearate, ~0.7% (acts as accelerator)
- Liquid (eugenol, ~85%, olive oil ~15%)

ZOE impression pastes are sold in two separate tubes. The first tube contains zinc oxide and vegetable or mineral oil, while the second tube contains eugenol and rosin. The vegetable or mineral oil acts as a plasticizer and helps to counteract the irritant action of eugenol.

Clove oil, which contains 70% to 85% eugenol, is sometimes used instead of eugenol because it causes less burning sensation in patients when it comes into contact with soft tissues. Rosin added to the paste in the second tube speeds up the reaction and produces a smoother, more homogeneous product.

Canada balsam and Balsam of Peru are often used to increase flow and improve mixing properties. If the mixed paste is too thin or lacks body before it sets, a filler (such as a wax) or an inert powder (such as kaolin, talc, or diatomaceous earth) may be added to one or both of the original pastes.
