= Bioactive agents =

Bioactive agents are substances that can influence an organism, tissue or cell. Examples include enzymes, drugs, vitamins, phytochemicals, and bioactive compounds.

Bioactive agents can be incorporated into polymers, which has applications in drug delivery and commercial production of household goods and biomedical devices. In drug delivery systems, bioactive agents are loaded into enzyme-responsive polymers which can then be cleaved by target enzymes. Activation of the bioactive agents leads to the release of therapeutic cargos.
