= Atraumatic restorative treatment =

Treatment for dental caries

Atraumatic restorative treatment (ART) is a method for cleaning out tooth decay (dental caries) from teeth using only hand instruments (dental hatchet and spoon-excavator) and placing a filling. It does not use rotary dental instruments (dental drills) to prepare the tooth and can be performed in settings with no access to dental equipment. No drilling or local anaesthetic injections are required. ART is considered a conservative approach, not only because it removes the decayed tissue with hand instruments, avoiding removing more tissue than necessary which preserves as much tooth structure as possible, but also because it avoids pulp irritation and minimises patient discomfort. ART can be used for small, medium and deep cavities (where decay has not reached the tooth nerve dental pulp) caused by dental caries.

In shallow to medium-sized cavities (lesions), the decayed tissue removal is carried out until the soft tissue (demineralised dentine) is completely removed and harder tissue is reached (firm dentine). In deeper cavities (lesions that reach more than two-thirds of dentine thickness on a radiograph), the removal of the decay must be carried out more carefully in order to avoid reaching the tooth's pulp (dental nerve). Soft tissue should be left on the cavity floor. The decision on how much decay to remove (whether to carry out the decay removal to firm dentine or stop when soft dentine has been reached) depends on the depth of the cavity (a filling needs to have a minimum thickness of material to remain strong); and the possibility of reaching the tooth's pulp (the nerve is exposed sometimes when deep cavities are accessed with rotary burs or vigorously with hand instruments, compromising the tooth's vitality).

Dental radiographs need to be taken to evaluate the depth of the cavity and extension of decay. If too deep and close to the pulp, only the soft decayed tissue is removed from the cavity floor to avoid the risk of pulp exposure.

ART is suitable for both primary (baby teeth) and permanent dentition (adult teeth) and has a large evidence base supporting it.

== Background and history ==
ART was firstly introduced by the dentist Jo Frencken in 1985. It was introduced in Tanzania, where access to dental treatments using drills was restricted by limited dentist availability and a lack of electricity and or piped water. As a result, children's teeth generally decayed until they caused pain or infection and removal was required. At that time, the dentists tried to use only hand instruments to open and/or enlarge small cavities and selectively remove the decayed tissue, followed by the placement of a glass ionomer cement, an adhesive filling that also releases fluoride and helps the tooth's "recovery" from decay (remineralisation). This treatment was tested in clinical trials and found to be effective.

Although ART was initially developed in response to the needs of populations with less access to dental care, it had similar outcomes to more invasive treatments (local anaesthetic and drilling the tooth with dental bur). This means that it is suitable for use in any type of setting (from deprived communities to dental clinics) and it has been widely adopted into mainstream care. Due to its "atraumatic approach", it has also been proven to be beneficial for patients with dental anxiety or learning disabilities, even where there is adequate dental care, as neither drilling nor local anaesthetics are required.

During the International Caries Consensus Collaboration (ICCC) meeting held in Leuven in 2015, ART was recommended by an international group of experts in cariology, restorative and paediatric dentistry as an option to treat decayed primary and permanent teeth with decay where restorative options were indicated, such as cavities that were difficult to clean using only toothbrushes and fluoride toothpaste.

== Concept ==
There are two different ART procedures with different aims: preventive (ART fissure sealant for non-cavitated teeth); and restorative (ART filling for decayed and cavitated teeth)

=== Preventive ===
Adult teeth that erupt behind the baby back teeth have deep grooves (fissures) and are more susceptible to accumulating food debris and dental plaque which can stagnate and lead to decay. They are also difficult to toothbrush properly. While they are erupting, they are very susceptible to decay and it is very difficult to keep them dry enough to use a resin-based sealant material successfully. However, sealing the tooth pits and fissures helps make cleaning the tooth easier and stops the accumulation of plaque biofilm, so a high viscosity glass ionomer cement (HVGIC) is used to seal these teeth, covering the pits and fissures. This is done by cleaning the tooth, placing a layer of HVGIC over the back teeth and using finger pressure to keep it in place and dry until the HVGIC material sets. Excess material is removed. If necessary, it is adjusted to fit the bite using hand instruments.

=== Restorative ===
Where the enamel (the hard outer surface of the tooth) has cavitated or even has a small breach due to tooth decay, the cavity can be enlarged with special hand instruments when necessary to enable access to the soft decayed tooth tissue. After removing as much decay as necessary, the cavity is cleaned with water, dried and filled with the HVGIC. The filling seals the cavity preventing food debris and dental plaque stagnating inside the cavity. It also promotes remineralisation of the dental tissues affected by decay. When the cavity is sealed any decay and bacteria that has been left on the floor of the cavity cannot get access to oxygen and sugar and will not continue.

== Effectiveness of sealants ==
1. The retention rate of ART sealants using HVGIC has improved significantly compared to low and medium viscosity-viscosity glass-ionomers previously used.
2. ART sealants appear to have a high caries preventive effect.
3. ART/HVGIC sealants are effective in controlling dentine-carious-lesion development in pits and fissures.
4. Occurrence of secondary carious lesions are rare at the tooth-restoration interface of single-surface ART/HVGIC restorations in primary teeth.

=== ART sealants versus resin-based sealants ===
1. Compared to resin composite sealants, ART/HVGIC sealants appear to be more effective in erupting permanent molars where moisture control is hard to achieve due to the water-like nature of the glass-ionomer material and less sensitive technique. However, moisture control should always be attempted as much as possible for a better material survival.
2. The full- and partial-retention survival of ART/HVGIC is lower compared to resin-based sealants.
3. 4 systematic reviews and meta-analyses, one of which is a Cochrane review. show that there is no difference in terms of dentine caries-lesion preventive effects between both types of sealants.

== Indications ==
ART fillings can be used in multiple situations, such as for single-surface cavities in primary (baby teeth) and permanent (adult) teeth, and multiple-surface cavities in primary teeth, if no other option is available or suitable (e.g. Hall Technique). They can also be used for non-frankly cavitated lesions (presenting a shadow under the enamel) that are not suitable for sealing. In addition, the procedure is particularly suitable for children, uncooperative, disabled and anxious patients.

== Contraindications ==
ART fillings should not be used when there is:

1. Swelling or a fistula near the decayed tooth;
2. Pulpal exposure (the nerve of the tooth is visible);
3. History of pain from the teeth to be treated;
4. Lesions that cannot be accessed with hand instruments (proximal side);
5. Multi-surface cavities in permanent teeth; and
6. Teeth that are badly broken down, which are unrestorable.

== Effectiveness ==
1. ART is effective for restoring single-surface cavities in both primary and permanent dentition and should be considered as the preferred option.
2. ART shows higher failure rates for multi-surface carious lesions restorations when compared to single-surface lesions. Meta-analysis concluded that the mean annual failure rate for multiple-surface ART restorations in primary teeth are still high.
3. Very few studies have investigated the survival (success) of ART restorations in multiple-surface cavities in permanent teeth, and it is not possible to draw conclusions yet.
4. ART preserves the tooth structure as only the soft demineralised tissue in deep cavities is removed.
5. Low pain and discomfort are experienced. Dental anxiety is lower when performing ART when compared to conventional drill-and-fill methods.

=== Comparison with conventional fillings ===
1. Systematic reviews and meta-analyses show that there are no differences between ART/HVGIC restorations in terms of longevity in primary teeth (for both single- and multiple-surface lesions) compared to the conventional methods using either amalgam or resin composite.
2. Systematic reviews and meta-analyses have shown that there are no differences between ART restorations for single-surface lesions in permanent teeth when compared to conventional filling methods.
3. However, a 2017 Cochrane Review on ART could not draw any conclusions about ART/HVGIC restorations compared to amalgam or composite restoration due to the low quality of the evidence.

== Evidence ==
Below is the summary of success of ART/HVGIC restorations in different type of cavities.

Type of cavities using ART/HVGIC	Evidence of restoration success
Single-surface in posterior primary teeth (baby back teeth) for first 2 years	High (survival percentage = 94.3% [± 1.5])
Multiple-surface in posterior primary teeth for first 2 years	Medium to low (survival percentage = 65.4% [± 3.9])
Single-surface in posterior permanent teeth (back adult teeth) for first 3 years	High (survival percentage = 87.1% [± 3.2])
Multiple-surface in posterior permanent teeth	No conclusion can be drawn due to insufficient data

Although originally developed for use in developing countries, due to its "atraumatic" approach, ART has become increasingly well accepted in developed countries. Although ART alone is insufficient to improve the oral health of people in low- and middle-income countries in a sustainable manner, the World Health Organization (WHO) Collaborating Centre of Oral Health Care Planning and Future Scenarios in Nijmegen has included it in the Basic Package of Oral Care (BPOC). This aims to improve the oral health of deprived communities in a cost-effective manner. This package comprises three components:

- Oral urgent treatment (OUT) – relief of oral pain (through extracting non-repairable painful teeth; and other urgent treatment), first aid for oral infections and dental trauma;
- Affordable fluoride toothpaste (AFT) – through oral health promotion and prevention of caries and gingivitis through toothbrushing using toothpaste fluoride; and
- Atraumatic restorative treatment (ART) – operative and preventive caries management through the use of the ART approach (sealants and fillings), introduction of dental care to young children and patients with dental fear or anxiety, presenting with mental or physical disabilities or home-bound elderly and those stay in nursing homes; and ART as an intermediate treatment to stabilize conditions in high-risk caries clinical situations.

=== ART in multiple-surface cavities ===
ART/HVGIC restorations can be successfully used in single-surface lesions in both primary (SDCEP) and permanent teeth. For multi-surface lesions (tooth decay that has spread across more than one surface of the tooth), systematic reviews and meta-analyses show that the mean failure rate of ART/HVGIC restorations is higher than occlusal lesions and with a wide range of success. In these cases, there is evidence that the Hall Technique may be more successful.

As for multiple-surface cavities in posterior permanent teeth, there is insufficient data to draw conclusions about its use and effectiveness. Therefore, in this case, alternative treatments should be attempted. These might include selective caries removal followed by restoration using conventional filling materials (usually resin composite) depending on the clinical situation.

== Advantages and limitations ==
=== Advantages ===
- Conserves tooth structure;
- Non-aerosol generating (considered important in the acute COVID-19 pandemic situation and maybe similar for other respiratory infectious disease outbreaks);
- Does not require a dental surgery and can be carried out in school or some settings;
- Minimises trauma (related to dental anxiety);
- Biologically friendly approach;
- As an introduction of dental care to young children, it is more acceptable than the conventional drill-and-fill method;
- Is a patient-friendly approach for children, adults with dental anxiety or phobia, elderly and special-needs patients; and
- Low cost as hand instruments and HVGIC which are relatively cheaper are used.

=== Reasons for using hand instruments ===
- More patient-friendly as hand instruments cause less pain and discomfort compared to rotary instruments;
- Increases accessibility of restorative care to wider populations (can be carried out in deprived communities, clinics, patient's home or hospital);
- Minimally invasive, therefore causes less trauma to the teeth and preserve teeth structure;
- Hand instruments are easily available and less expensive compared to electrically driven dental equipment;
- Because no "live" dentine is removed and pressure on the dentinal tubules is avoided, local anaesthetic (LA) is not required, reducing psychological trauma to patients; and
- Infection control is more straightforward; hand instruments can be cleaned and sterilised easily.

=== Reasons for using HVGIC ===
- Low cost;
- Allows the use of "press-finger" method to place the material into the cavity – some excess will spread along the margins and over the pits and fissures, acting as an ART sealant and providing extra preventive benefit;
- Releases fluoride that may be sustained for very long period of time which helps in tissue remineralisation;
- Adhesive and bio-compatible, i.e. does not irritate pulp or gingiva and has a co-efficient of thermal expansion similar to tooth structure;
- Less potential for recurrent caries;
- Since HVGIC relies on chemical adhesion to the tooth there is less need to remove healthy tissue to create mechanical retention;
- Easy to manipulate and repair if there are any defects or excess material;
- Can achieve good cavity seal;
- Seals decay into the tooth away from sugar and oxygen which it needs to progress. This helps in managing dental carious lesions without removing additional tooth and without damaging the pulp.

=== Limitations ===
- No conclusion has been made on the long-term survival rates of GIC ART restorations and sealants; the longest study reported so far is of three years duration although this is likely to be a good lifespan for primary teeth;
- The technique might not be readily accepted by oral healthcare personnel because they may not be prepared to carry out selective removal of decay;
- The possibility of hand fatigue from the use of hand instruments; and
- GIC produced by hand mixing might be relatively unstandardized, even if the manufacturer's instructions are followed.

== In combination with other approaches ==
=== Use with conditioner ===
HVGIC has been proven to perform better when a dentine conditioner (cavity conditioner; GC) in used prior to placement of the restorative material. The conditioner is made up of 20% polyacrylic acid and 3% aluminum chloride hexahydrate. It helps to improve the bonding of GIC to the tooth surface by eliminating the smear layer and debris. It also has the advantage of sealing the dentinal tubules to eliminate sensitivity.

=== Chemo-mechanical approach ===
This approach comprises the use of chemical material (e.g. Papacarie and Carisolv) which contains enzymes and proteases that soften the decayed tooth structure before removing the decay mechanically. In ART, these chemical materials can be used in conjunction with hand instruments while removing dental caries as they have the advantage of improving treatment comfort by reducing the pain, heat and vibration experienced, and making ART more accepted for children.

== Examples of use in different countries ==
Brazil	Atraumatic restorative treatment (ART) for a disadvantaged Brazilian community: "Training oral health personnel in October 2001, three oral health teams were included in the Family Health Programme in this area. These teams and other dentists in the public health network were trained by a university teacher in the area, to perform ART restorations using glass ionomer cement."
South Africa	Introducing the atraumatic restorative treatment (ART) approach in Liberian Refugee Services: "In 1997, twelve lay refugees in the Liberian refugee camp were trained in basic oral health care including ART according to WHO training module. This primary oral health programme for refugees were revisited after 3 years in December 1999. The 12 trained refugees maintained an oral health clinic in the camp, where patients were treated with ART."
Sri Lanka	Atraumatic restorative treatment (ART) programme in Sri Lanka (based on WHO 2008 Oral Health Database): "Once a month a team of dentists and about 10 dental students from the Division of Community Dentistry visit a primary school in the Kandy area. The faculty receive requests from the Principals of schools, mainly from impoverished areas where the schoolchildren otherwise will not receive any dental care. The students, supervised by the doctors, carry out the examination and treatment in a well-lit classroom or outside in the school premises. While the children are waiting for treatment, they are given oral health education by the dental students. ART is carried out on about 25-30 children on one visit. Around 250 students are provided with ART per year."
Turkey	Atraumatic restorative treatment (ART) programme in some rural areas of Turkey: "From year 1997, dentists and often dental students visit the rural areas including Bagivar, a small town in Anatolia. ART restorations are performed in school children, farm worker's children living in tents or children working in cotton fields."

== In minimal intervention dentistry ==
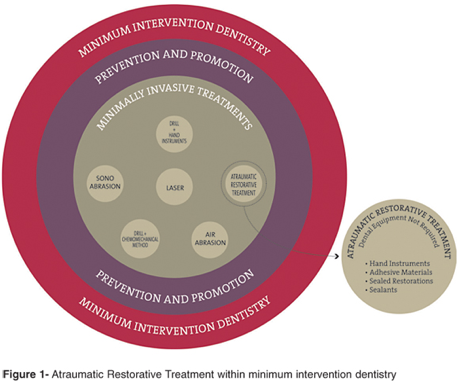
ART in minimal intervention dentistry

ART is one part of the minimal intervention dentistry (MID) concept and is minimally invasive. It consists of both preventive and restorative components. In ART, the preventive component involves using ART sealants for vulnerable pits and fissures of teeth, whereas the restorative treatment part of the MID involves selective removal of the infected dentine using hand instruments while conserving the affected dentine that can be remineralized, preserving as much tooth structure as possible. This is followed by cavity restoration with HVGIC.
