= Minimal intervention dentistry =

Type of dental practice

Minimal intervention (MI) dentistry is a modern dental practice designed around the principal aim of preservation of as much of the natural tooth structure as possible. It uses a disease-centric philosophy that directs attention to first control and management of the disease that causes tooth decay—dental caries—and then to relief of the residual symptoms it has left behind—the decayed teeth. The approach uses similar principles for prevention of future caries, and is intended to be a complete management solution for tooth decay.

== History ==
Classical restorative dentistry has traditionally followed the century-old approach of G. V. Black in classification and treatment of tooth decay. This was based on very limited knowledge at the time about the pathology of the underlying dental caries disease, and the need to specially prepare a cavity to repair a lesion (decayed area) with the limited available materials. Therefore, the only approach was to treat the symptoms—to remove the decay and restore the tooth surgically. Modern science has since allowed for better understanding of the pathology, thus opening the door for new methodologies and approaches to treatment. The practice of minimal intervention dentistry was designed to utilise these new possibilities by implementing a disease-centric philosophy to management of tooth decay. While advances in dental science are of course used in mainstream dental practice, MI dentistry has redesigned the treatment guidelines beginning with a new classification of caries lesions. This classification was intended to reflect the possibility of curing the disease and remineralising (hardening) early lesions before irreversible damage has been done. It was first published by Mount and Hume in 1997 and has subsequently been revised.

Some see minimally invasive dentistry as merely a philosophical change, but since the practice has been in mainstream discussion in the late 1990s, it has acquired some respectable international academic backing.

== Approach to restorative dentistry ==
The approach of minimal intervention dentistry is centred on management of the dental caries disease responsible for tooth decay, first controlling and curing the disease, then restoring the tooth, filling only where necessary, and finally prevention of future caries.

=== Treatment: controlling and curing ===
Classical dietary and oral hygiene techniques of reducing sugar content and eating frequency, and removing plaque by effective brushing, are still very important practices for treatment as well as prevention. Also, biochemical techniques can be used to treat the bacterial infection directly. Agents such as chlorhexidine can help fight gum disease and thus reduce the amount of bacteria in the mouth that are responsible for tooth decay. After a wave of empirical studies on the efficacy of xylitol (a sugar alcohol), a consensus report in the British Dental Journal considered it to give a reduction in the risk of caries. There is also increasing use of newer technologies such as photo-activated disinfection and treating with ozone.

There is also an aspect of minimising the effect of the caries to control the symptoms of decay. Constant remineralisation (hardening) with continuous application of fluoride toothpaste is highly common practice that reduces the impact of the caries on decay. Changing the biochemical properties of saliva, potentially through the use of appropriate drugs, can help the buffering capacity of the saliva to resist changes in pH caused by plaque acid, resisting the acid attack caused by the active caries.

=== Restoration ===
Decay is the process or result of demineralisation (softening) of an area of dental tissue, creating a decayed lesion on the tooth. The process of restoring decay begins with an analysis of the decayed lesions together with their location and severity, with particular regard to the state of reversibility. Where decay is reversible, it is referred to as non-cavitated decay, where healing is possible by the hardening process of remineralisation. Where a cavity has formed from excessive demineralisation, the decay has reached the point of no return where the tooth structure has been lost and the decay is permanent and non-reversible. In this situation of cavitated decay, the cavity will have to be filled to restore the tooth. Minimal intervention dentistry is focused on filling only cavitated regions, leaving non-cavitated decay to be remineralised, thus restoring the tooth while removing as little of the tooth structure as possible, enhancing the strength and aesthetics of the restoration. Classifications of the location and severity of decay are made in order to establish guidelines for suitable treatment methods.

==== Identification and classification of carious lesions ====
The minimal intervention approach to classification was originally introduced by G. J. Mount and R. W. Hume in A new classification for dentistry, and later modified by other journal articles and books mainly by Mount and Hume. This classification aims to provide a useful guide to the clinical approach required in treatment, depending on the characteristics of the lesion. The first stage is to determine cavitation, then followed by determining the restorative approach to any cavitated areas, with suitable treatment for remineralisation of the non-cavitated areas.

==== Remineralisation of non-cavitated lesions ====
Various techniques exists for remineralisation, varying from simple application of fluoride to using special substances for filling materials that interact with the tooth to aid the process from within. Glass ionomer cements (GICs) have been shown to undergo ion exchange with the surrounding tooth structure, and also engage in fluoride feeding. Research by Prof. Hien Ngo and others has shown that these methods can in practice heal some non-cavitated lesions.

=== Prevention ===
The same methods for cure of the disease can be used for prevention, as well as other techniques such as the use of fissure sealants in high-risk individuals.

== See also ==
- Hall Technique
