= Hall Technique =

Dental treatment for molars

The Hall Technique is a minimally-invasive treatment for decayed baby back (molar) teeth. Decay is sealed under preformed (stainless steel) crowns, avoiding injections and drilling. It is one of a number of biologically oriented strategies for managing dental decay.

The technique has an evidence base showing that it is acceptable to children, parents and dentists and it is preferred over standard filling techniques, due to the ease of application and overall patient comfort as young patients do not have to undergo traumatic injections. Preformed metal crowns are now recommended as the optimum restoration for managing carious primary molars. There are multiple randomised controlled trials that have shown the Hall Technique to be superior to other methods for managing decay in baby teeth, but there is a lack of evidence to conclude that the Hall Technique is superior to placing preformed metal crowns in a conventional manner. Initial fears over the potential problem with sealing caries (cavities) into teeth being that the caries process might only be slowed, rather than arrested and that the caries might still progress, leading to pain and infection later. This problem has not been realised with one study showing long-term data beyond five years, to when the baby teeth are lost, with fewer problems from the tooth with the crown.

Crowns placed using the Hall Technique have better long term outcomes (pain/infection and need for replacement) compared with standard fillings.

The technique has been used and found particularly valuable in a developing country with little access to dental services, or resources to support such services. It is also utilized in modern dental practices, as many parents and patients prefer treatment options that are minimally invasive and that help eliminate the need for sedation.

== History ==
Downloadable manual for the Hall technique

Preformed metal crowns have been used for restoring primary molars since the 1950s. Literature suggests preformed crowns placed on carious primary molar teeth reduce risk of major failure or pain in the long term compared to fillings. There is also evidence to suggest that fitting crowns using the Hall Technique reduces patient discomfort at the time of treatment in comparison to conventional fillings. It can also help reduce the overall time a patient spends in the dental chair due to the relatively simple and quick procedure when compared with traditional method of stainless steel crown (SSC) application.

The Hall Technique is named after Dr. Norna Hall, a dentist working in Scotland, who has developed a simplified technique where the crown is simply cemented over the carious primary molar, with no local anaesthesia, caries removal, or tooth preparation of any kind. The traditional method for management of dental caries has evolved from the exclusive domain of techniques based on complete caries removal prior to tooth restoration. Norna Hall used pre-formed crowns and cemented over carious primary molars using a glass-ionomer luting cement, with no caries removal, tooth preparation, or local anaesthesia.

The Hall Technique has been included in a guideline of the Scottish Dental Clinical Effectiveness Programme (SDCEP) and has helped to drive change in how dentists manage decay in primary teeth from the traditional invasive surgical approach to the less-invasive biological management of decay.

Clinical trials have shown the technique to be effective; however it is not an easy, quick-fix solution to the problem of carious primary molars. The technique is not suited to every tooth, child or clinician, but it can be an effective method of managing carious primary molars. The Hall Technique should not be used when there are clinical or radiographic signs and symptoms of irreversible pulpitis or dental abscess. Radiographically, there should be a clear band of dentine between the carious lesion and pulp for a Hall Technique to be suitable.

== Decay in baby teeth ==
Baby teeth are known as primary teeth or deciduous teeth. Biologically oriented strategies for managing dental decay are considered by their proponents to have advantages for child patients receiving dental care as the techniques are less invasive and often avoid having to use local anaesthesia and drilling. They are also less destructive and potentially damaging for primary teeth. Five randomised control trials with children, on decayed primary teeth, have been carried out looking at incomplete, or no removal of decay. These have looked at how much pain and infection or repeated treatment biological techniques (including the Hall Technique) compare to other treatment techniques including complete caries removal. These "minimal intervention" approaches reduce some of the adverse consequences associated with carrying out restorative treatment: conservation of tooth structure and integrity, maintenance of maximum pulpal floor dentinal thickness, which reduces the impact on pulpal health; reduced pulp exposure, and less need for local anaesthesia if no vital dentine is being removed, which has been shown to reduce children's reported discomfort.

A Cochrane systematic review has compared biologically oriented strategies (stepwise, partial and no-caries removal), with complete caries removal for managing decay in both primary and permanent teeth. Eight trials of 934 patients (1372 teeth) with outcomes reported for 1191 teeth were included in the analyses. The conclusion of the review was that for symptomless and vital teeth, biologically oriented strategies had clinical advantages over complete caries removal in the management of dentinal caries. Not only were there no differences in restoration longevity or in the numbers of teeth (or patients) experiencing pulpal pathology (pain or infection), but there were significantly less pulp exposures. For partial caries removal in primary teeth, this was a risk ratio of 0.24 [0.06,0.90], when caries were not completely removed.

== Use of technique in the permanent dentition ==
The Hall technique can also be used with permanent first molars in some cases where prognosis is poor, such as where first permanent molars are hypomineralised, carious with poor prognosis but to be maintained until full eruption of second molars, or for cuspal coverage of endodontically treated teeth in minors with compliance issues preventing full coverage crown preparation.

== Indications and contraindications ==
=== Indications ===
Hall Technique stainless steel crowns (SSC) are indicated for primary molars in the following situations:

- There is a proximal carious lesions where two or more surfaces have carious lesions.
  - Radiographically, a clear band of dentine should be able to be seen between the carious lesion and the dental pulp, the carious lesion does not extend beyond the middle third of dentine, and there is a clear dentine bridge between the pulp and the cavity.
- Restoration of fractured primary molars
- In primary molars that may be affected by developmental problems both localized or generalized i.e. in cases of enamel hypoplasia, dentinogenesis imperfecta, amelogenesis imperfecta, molar incisor hypomineralisation (MIH).
- In patients who are at high risk of developing caries i.e. patients who have to undergo general anaesthesia for dental treatment due to rampant caries.
- To protect and restore teeth that may have extensive tooth tissue loss due to erosion, attrition or abrasion.
- As a support for some dental appliances e.g. space maintainers
- In patients with special needs or where regular oral hygiene is impaired leading to likely breakdown of regular direct restorations.
- In patients with partially submerged primary molars in order to maintain the mesiodistal space.

=== Contraindications ===
Hall Technique stainless steel crowns are contraindicated in the following instances:

- The patient is known to be sensitive or allergic to nickel unless approval is given from an allergist or dermatologist first.
- There is any evidence that the carious lesion has irreversibly damaged the pulp:
  - radiographically there is no obvious clear band of dentine visible between the carious lesion and the dental pulp on the radiograph and/or there is periradicular radiolucency (furcation involvement) indicating infection or
  - clinically – symptoms of irreversible pulpitis or pulpal necrosis
- More than half of the root has resorbed and the primary tooth is close to exfoliation.
- Where a tooth is so broken down as to be unrestorable with a preformed metal crown (PMC)

== Procedure ==
The Hall Technique sometimes requires several appointments to allow separation of the teeth in order to place the preformed crown to be fitted with no additional tooth removal or anaesthetic.

Diagnostics and radiographs will be required initially. Once it has been established that the Hall Technique is indicated the following stages will be likely to occur.

=== Appointment 1: separator placement ===
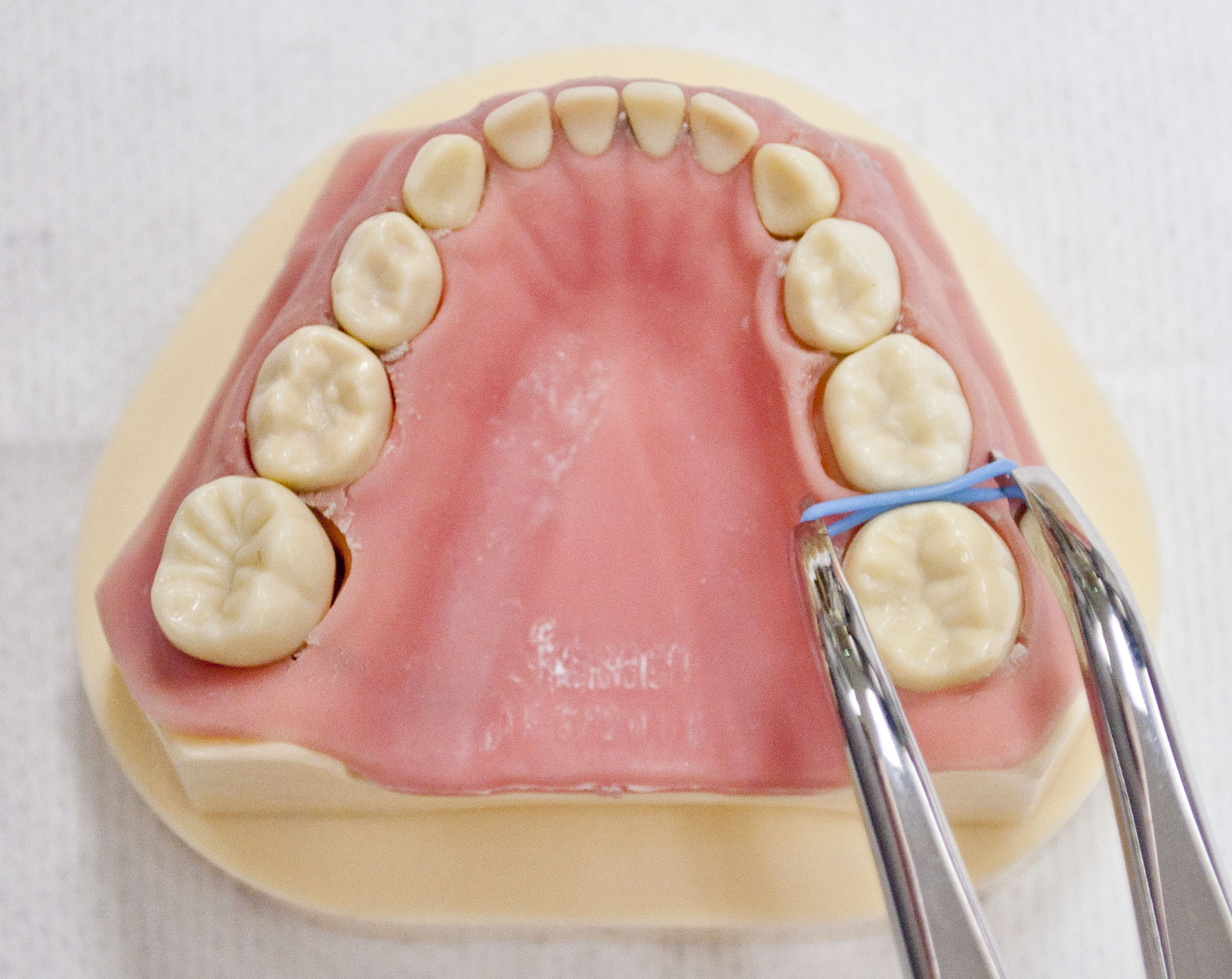
Image 1: Insertion of a separator on a dental model

To enable the stainless steel crown to be placed on the tooth, there must be sufficient space between the teeth. If this space is not currently available, orthodontic separators may be placed between the tooth indicated for the Hall Technique and adjacent teeth (see image 1). If the placement is impaired due to interproximal breakdown a temporary restorative material may be used to build up the contact point to allow the effective placement of separators. However, temporary restorative material is not a common practice of the Hall Technique, and case selection appropriateness should be considered. The separators are generally placed 3–5 days prior to the placement of the stainless steel crown to space to be created. The clinician will provide advice on this procedure and how to proceed if these fall out prior to the next appointment.

=== Appointment 2: Hall Technique ===
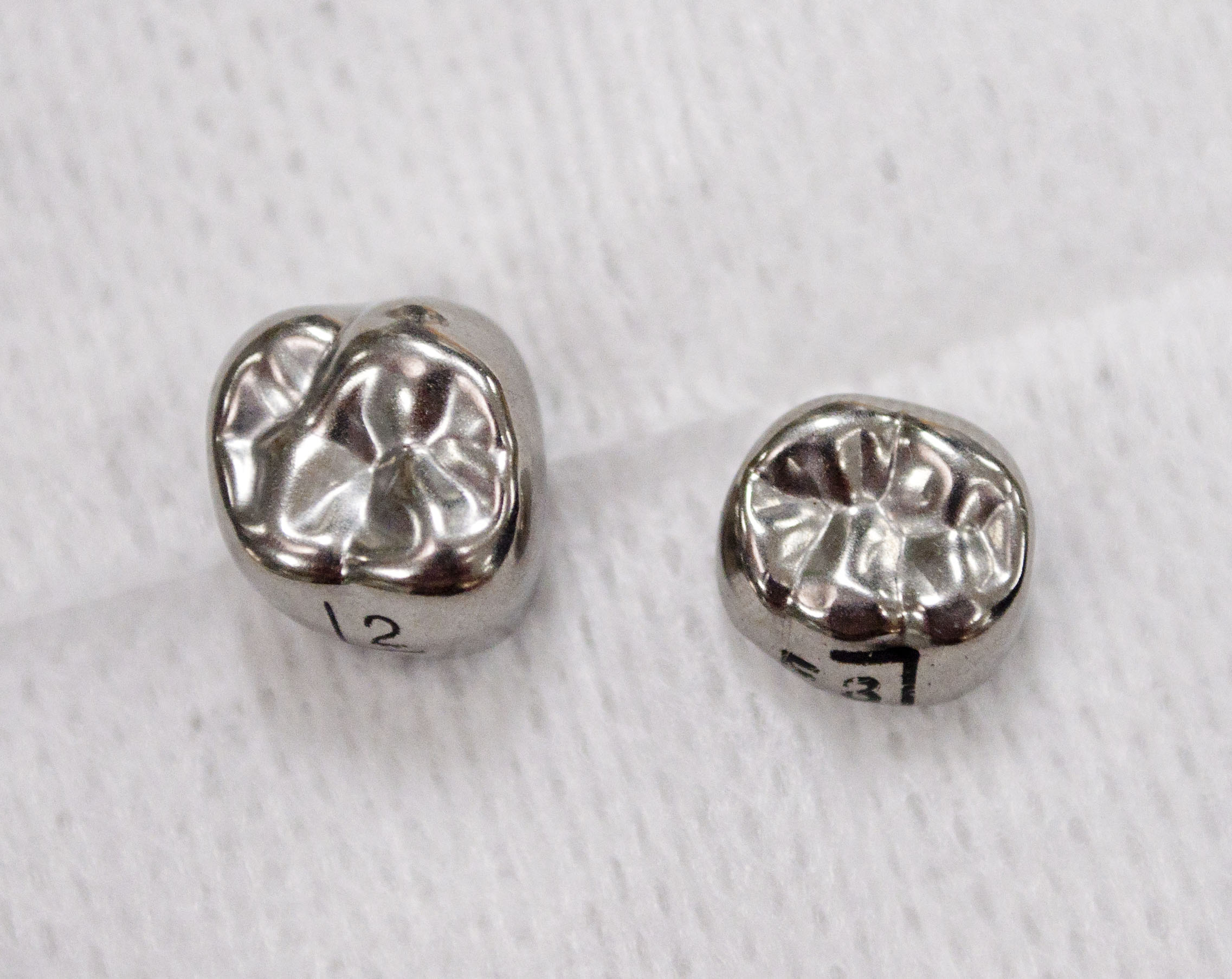
Image 2: Stainless steel crowns

The stainless steel crowns are selected by tooth type, location and size (see image 2). The tooth will be measured to identify the most suitable size of stainless steel crown. The clinician will try the stainless steel crown prior to its cementation, to ensure that it fits correctly, and establish if an alternative size or contouring of the stainless steel crown is required. When placing the stainless steel crown within the mouth, the airways will generally be protected by placing gauze around the site, or the clinician may secure the stainless steel with tape/Elastoplast. Once a correct size and fit is established, the crown may be adhered to the tooth. The stainless steel crown is secured to the tooth by partially filling the stainless steel crown with a self-curing glass ionomer cement and then placing over the tooth. The stainless steel crown should "click" securely into place. The patient is required to bite firmly onto a cotton roll or bite stick to secure it in the correct position whilst it sets. The excess of glass ionomer cement will be wiped off or removed with knotted floss from between the interproximal contact, and a sickle probe from the buccal gingival sulcus on the buccal and lingual/palatal surfaces.

=== Appointment 3: follow-up appointment ===
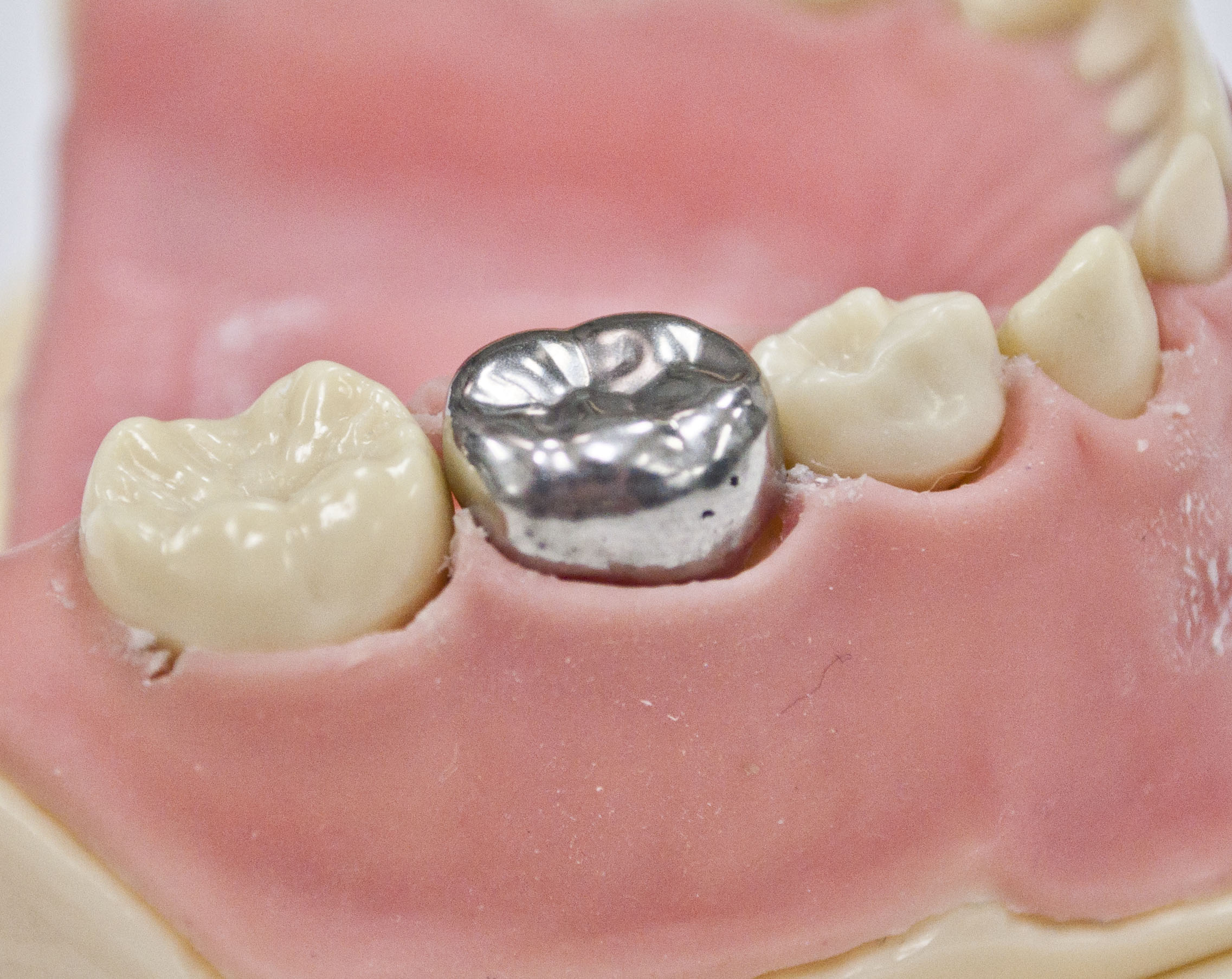
Stainless steel crown placed on a dental model

At follow-up appointments the Hall Technique crown will be assessed clinically and radiographically when required. The tooth will still be able to exfoliate naturally, and the tooth should exfoliate with the crown in place. However, if the patient experiences pain/discomfort after the initial few days, they should consult their dental professional. A dental professional should also be consulted if the crown falls off, as this will prevent the management of the decay.

=== Materials/instruments ===
- Mirror
- Probe/explorer
- Separators and pliers or floss for placement
- Floss – knotted for removing excess cement
- Gauze for airway protection
- Stainless steel crown (checked for correct size)
- Luting cement
- Glass ionomer cement applicator and amalgamator (if mixing cement hand mixed glass ionomer is recommended as it can be mixed to a less viscous consistency)

== Advantages and disadvantages of Hall Technique ==
=== Advantages ===
- Patients report positive experiences during and after treatment
- 97% success rate
- Very low failure rate
- Does not require local anesthetic or tooth removal (drilling)
- Lifespan is the same as that of an intact primary tooth/durability
- Provide protection to the residual tooth structure that may be weakened
- The technique sensitivity or the risk of making errors during application is low
- Their long term cost-effectiveness is good
- Reduce the amount of tooth extraction and extensive treatment
- Desensitises children to dental procedures, acclimatising them and building their confidence

=== Disadvantages ===
- Metallic appearance/aesthetics
- Cannot be used when tooth is only partially erupted.
- Failure may occur due to periodontal abscess or periradicular abscess if decay has progressed too far into the tooth for it to be arrested before reaching the pulp (failure rate around 3 per 100).
- When proximal teeth are in tight contact (touching), this technique requires two visits and the use of orthodontic separators, which cause soreness.

== Patient expectations ==
- The child and parent should be fully briefed on the procedure.
- The child should be shown the crown. Some children respond better to the idea of the crown being a "Terminator tooth", "Iron Man tooth", shiny helmet tooth or a princess tiara tooth.
- It is important that the child knows that during the procedure they may be required to bite down to help seat the crown correctly. They must also know that the cement may not taste nice but will not last long.
- After the crown is fitted using the Hall Technique is placed the child may find that biting feels unusual. This feeling will return to normal in a few days.
- The gums may appear blanched and feel tight to the child at first but will settle very quickly.
- The gum may also appear blue around the crown. This is just the colour of the metal sitting under the gum.
- Avoid giving the child sticky or chewy foods after the procedure as this may displace the crown.
- It is important that the child still brushes the tooth to help maintain the crown.

== Alternative therapies ==
- No treatment; when dental caries are detected in deciduous teeth some clinicians may choose to leave the tooth to monitor progression and wait for further caries progression until doing an invasive procedure. Alternatively, the clinician may choose to leave caries as the tooth may be likely to exfoliate soon, dependent on the child's age.
- Conventional stainless steel crown; conventional stainless steel crowns require tooth preparation, usually interproximal and occlusal reductions. Under most circumstances this procedure will require local anesthetic. This procedure is invasive and there is loss of biological dental tissues, which is not required for Hall Technique stainless steel crowns.
- Dental restoration; this may be a good management option. However, this procedure is invasive and usually requires local anesthetic and tooth preparation (drilling). Indirect fillings such as stainless steel crowns have a higher longevity when compared to direct restorations.
- Dental extraction; in most situations if a deciduous tooth is indicated for Hall Technique stainless steel crown an extraction would not be a suitable option. Dental extraction is considered invasive and in caries management it is usually the last resort when a tooth cannot be saved.
