= Temporary restoration =

Temporary restoration is a temporary filling of a prepared tooth until permanent restoration is carried out. It is used to cover the prepared part of the tooth, in order to maintain the occlusal space and the contact points, and insulation of the pulpal tissues and maintenance of the periodontal relationship. Permanent restoration is not always done after tooth preparation; it can be done simply to prepare for indirect restoration such as inlays and onlays.

Temporary fillings are also used for stabilization techniques where many restorations are needed, and the problem may become worse before it can be fully treated. In these cases, temporary fillings are placed in order to stop progression.

Although temporary restorations are only meant to be worn for a few weeks, proper care is required to ensure they stay in place. As with any restoration, proper oral hygiene, including brushing and flossing at least twice a day and rinsing with fluoride-containing fluids, is necessary to keep temporary restorations in good condition.

Chewing on hard objects can cause temporary fillings to break or chip off. Avoiding hard or sticky foods can diminish the risk of a temporary filling falling off. In most cases, it is recommended not to chew on the same side as the temporary filling. If a temporary filling has broken or peeled off, it is important to see a dentist to have the problem repaired. In some cases, a damaged temporary filling may need to be replaced or removed.

There are four different types of temporary materials to choose from: Methacrylate resins, bis-acrylic (composite) resins, pre-formed composite crowns, PMMA disks for CAD/CAM production. For the latter two options, the range of indications is limited: a prefabricated composite crown is only suitable for single units in the posterior part of the mouth. Making temporary crowns from polymethylmethacrylate disks is time-consuming, labor-intensive, and costly. Consequently, this option is only practical for particularly difficult recovery cases. Thus, for most cases, the choice is between methacrylate and bis-acrylic resins.

== Materials used ==
- Zinc oxide eugenol
- Intermediate restorative materials
- Zinc phosphate cement
