= Chalky teeth =

Dental abnormality

Chalky teeth is a colloquial term for teeth with abnormal appearance or structure. It typically describes tooth enamel with unusual color, texture, or shape (morphology). Resembling blackboard chalk, "chalky enamel" appears discolored, opaque, soft, porous, and prone to degradation or staining, unlike normal enamel, which is translucent, hard, and impermeable. The term, including variants like "chalky molars" or "chalky enamel", often serves as a metaphor for teeth with a higher risk of tooth decay. The public "Chalky Teeth Campaign" emphasized the socioeconomic burden of this dental issue and the need for research into prevention. The gritty sensation from oxalate-rich foods, such as spinach, may also be called "chalky teeth".

== Dental anomalies ==
Since 1920, academic literature has used "chalky teeth" to describe specific dental defects. Most references point to enamel issues with a chalky appearance (white, cream, or brown) of developmental origin, including amelogenesis imperfecta, enamel hypomineralisation, dental fluorosis, and molar hypomineralisation. Early-stage tooth decay also appears as "chalky white spots." A notable toothpaste advertisement featuring schoolteacher "Mrs Marsh" used a chalk metaphor to describe that condition.

== Causes ==
Developmental chalky teeth, arising during tooth development inside the jaw, stem from pathological disturbances, suggesting potential for medical prevention. Enamel hypomineralisation often results from local trauma or medical conditions, such as fever, respiratory disease, vitamin D deficiency, or adverse drug reaction. Dental fluorosis occurs from excessive fluoride during enamel development. These acquired disorders typically affect only a few teeth and may be preventable. In contrast, amelogenesis imperfecta, a rare genetic disorder, often causes all teeth to appear chalky.

== Global concerns ==
Chalky teeth, particularly "chalky molars" or molar hypomineralisation, affect about 20% of children worldwide, increasing tooth decay risk. Despite recognition in academic and societal circles, public health, dentistry, and maternal and child health policies often overlook that issue. In 2007, The D3 Group advocated for research into managing and preventing chalky teeth. In 2013, they launched the Chalky Teeth Campaign and an online education resource to raise public awareness. Materials, including a children’s storybook about chalky molars, targeted non-specialist audiences.
