= Total viable organism =

Total viable organism (or TVO) is a term used in microbiology to quantify the amount of microorganisms present in a sample. Each sample is usually cultured on a variety of agar plates (petri dishes) often containing different types of selective media. The colony-forming units (CFUs) are calculated after allowing time for growth.

TVO numbers are used to quantify the CFUs for a given amount of sample and often include dilution factors. For example, a 1 mL sample of water containing 10 CFUs on one plate would have a TVO value of 10 cfu/mL.
