= Glass ionomer cement =

Material used in dentistry as a filling material

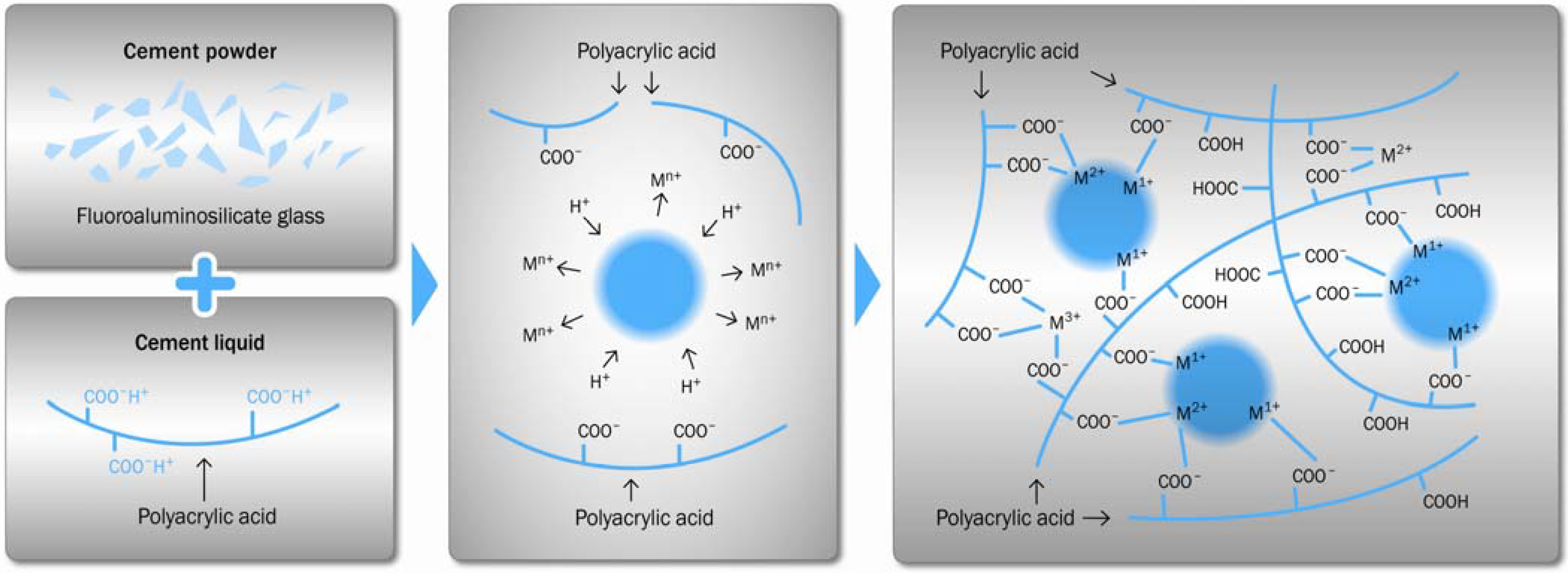
Glass ionomer

A glass ionomer cement (GIC) is a dental restorative material used in dentistry as a filling material and luting cement, including for orthodontic bracket attachment. Glass-ionomer cements are based on the reaction of silicate glass-powder (calciumaluminofluorosilicate glass) and polyacrylic acid, an ionomer. Occasionally water is used instead of an acid, altering the properties of the material and its uses. This reaction produces a powdered cement of glass particles surrounded by matrix of fluoride elements and is known chemically as glass polyalkenoate. There are other forms of similar reactions which can take place, for example, when using an aqueous solution of acrylic/itaconic copolymer with tartaric acid, this results in a glass-ionomer in liquid form. An aqueous solution of maleic acid polymer or maleic/acrylic copolymer with tartaric acid can also be used to form a glass-ionomer in liquid form. Tartaric acid plays a significant part in controlling the setting characteristics of the material. Glass-ionomer based hybrids incorporate another dental material, for example resin-modified glass ionomer cements (RMGIC) and compomers (or modified composites).

Non-destructive neutron scattering has evidenced GIC setting reactions to be non-monotonic, with eventual fracture toughness dictated by changing atomic cohesion, fluctuating interfacial configurations and interfacial terahertz (THz) dynamics.

It is on the World Health Organization's List of Essential Medicines.

== Background ==
Glass ionomer cement is primarily used in the prevention of dental caries. This dental material has good adhesive bond properties to tooth structure, allowing it to form a tight seal between the internal structures of the tooth and the surrounding environment. Dental caries is caused by acid, a byproduct of bacterial metabolism of dietary sugars for use as energy. The acid produced from this metabolism results in the breakdown of tooth enamel and subsequent inner structures of the tooth, if the disease is not intervened by a dental professional, or if the carious lesion does not arrest and/or the enamel re-mineralises by itself. Glass ionomer cements act as sealants when pits and fissures in the tooth occur and release fluoride to prevent further enamel demineralisation and promote remineralisation. Fluoride can also hinder bacterial growth, by inhibiting their metabolism of ingested sugars in the diet. It does this by inhibiting various metabolic enzymes within the bacteria. This leads to a reduction in the acid produced during the bacteria's metabolism of fermentable carbohydrates, preventing a further drop in pH and therefore preventing caries.

There is evidence that when using sealants, only 6% of people develop tooth decay over a 2-year period, in comparison to 40% of people when not using a sealant. However, it is recommended that the use of fluoride varnish alongside glass ionomer sealants should be applied in practice to further reduce the risk of secondary dental caries.

=== Resin-modified glass ionomers ===
The addition of resin to glass ionomers improves them significantly, allowing them to be more easily mixed and placed. Resin-modified glass ionomers allow equal or higher fluoride release and there is evidence of higher retention, higher strength and lower solubility. Resin-based glass ionomers have two setting reactions: an acid-base setting and a free-radical polymerisation. The free-radical polymerisation is the predominant mode of setting, as it occurs more rapidly than the acid-base mode. Only the material properly activated by light will be optimally cured. The presence of resin protects the cement from water contamination. Due to the shortened working time, it is recommended that placement and shaping of the material occurs as soon as possible after mixing.

== History ==
Dental sealants were first introduced as part of the preventative programme, in the late 1960s, in response to increasing cases of pits and fissures on occlusal surfaces due to caries. This led to glass ionomer cements to be introduced in 1972 by Wilson and Kent as derivative of the silicate cements and the polycarboxylate cements. The glass ionomer cements incorporated the fluoride releasing properties of the silicate cements with the adhesive qualities of polycarboxylate cements. This incorporation allowed the material to be stronger, less soluble and more translucent (and therefore more aesthetic) than its predecessors.

Glass ionomer cements were initially intended to be used for the aesthetic restoration of anterior teeth and were recommended for restoring Class III and Class V cavity preparations. There have now been further developments in the material's composition to improve properties. For example, the addition of metal or resin particles into the sealant is favoured due to the longer working time and the material being less sensitive to moisture during setting.

When glass ionomer cements were first used, they were mainly used for the restoration of abrasion/erosion lesions and as a luting agent for crown and bridge reconstructions. However, this has now been extended to occlusal restorations in deciduous dentition, restoration of proximal lesions and cavity bases and liners. This is made possible by the ever-increasing new formulations of glass ionomer cements.

One of the early commercially successful GICs, employing G338 glass and developed by Wilson and Kent, served purpose as non-load bearing restorative materials. However, this glass resulted in a cement too brittle for use in load-bearing applications such as in molar teeth. The properties of G338 being shown to be related to its phase-composition, specifically the interplay between its three amorphous phases Ca/Na-Al-Si-O, Ca-Al-F and Ca-P-O-F, as characterised by mechanical testing, differential scanning calorimetry (DSC) and X-ray diffraction (XRD), as well as quantum chemical modelling and ab initio molecular dynamics simulations.

== Glass ionomer versus resin-based sealants ==
When the two dental sealants are compared, there has always been a contradiction as to which materials is more effective in caries reduction. Therefore, there are claims against replacing resin-based sealants, the current gold standard, with glass ionomer.

=== Advantages ===
Glass ionomer sealants are thought to prevent caries through a steady fluoride release over a prolonged period and the fissures are more resistant to demineralization, even after the visible loss of sealant material, however, a systemic review found no difference in caries development when GICs was used as a fissure sealing material compared to the conventional resin based sealants, in addition, it has less retention to the tooth structure than the resin based sealants.

These sealants have hydrophilic properties, allowing them to be an alternative of the hydrophobic resin in the generally wet oral cavity. Resin-based sealants are easily destroyed by saliva contamination.

They chemically bond with both enamel and dentin and do not necessarily require preparation/mechanical retention and can therefore be applied without harming existing tooth structure. This makes them ideal in many situations when tooth preservation is foremost and with minimally invasive techniques, particularly Class V fillings where there is a larger area of exposed dentin with only a thin ring of enamel. This often results in longer retention and service life than resin Class V fillings.

They chemically bond to enamel and dentin leaving a smaller gap for bacteria to enter. Particularly when paired with silver diamine fluoride this can arrest caries and harden active caries and prevent further damage.

Conventional glass ionomer sealants (such as GC Fuji Triage) can be placed and cured outside of clinical settings and do not require a curing light. They typically harden in the mouth within 2 to 6 minutes, at which point they are initially set. Maturation then takes place over the following days and months, becoming harder and reaching maximum compressive strength at roughly one month after placement.

Chemically curable glass ionomer cements are considered safe from allergic reactions but a few have been reported with resin-based materials. Nevertheless, allergic reactions are very rarely associated with both sealants.

=== Disadvantages ===
The main disadvantage of glass ionomer sealants or cements has been inadequate retention or simply lack of strength, toughness, and limited wear resistance. For instance, due to its poor retention rate, periodic recalls are necessary, even after 6 months, to eventually replace the lost sealant. Different methods have been used to address the physical shortcomings of the glass ionomer cements such as thermo-light curing (polymerization), or addition of the zirconia, hydroxyapatite, N-vinyl pyrrolidone, N-vinyl caprolactam, and fluoroapatite to reinforce the glass ionomer cements.

== Clinical applications ==
Glass ionomers are widely used due to their versatile properties and ease of use. Prior to procedures, starter materials for glass ionomers are supplied as a powder and liquid or as a powder mixed with water. These materials can be mixed and encapsulated.

Preparation of the material should involve following manufacture instructions. A paper pad or cool dry glass slab may be used for mixing the raw materials, though the use of the glass slab will retard the reaction and hence increase the working time. The raw materials in liquid and powder form should not be dispensed onto the chosen surface until the mixture is required in the clinical procedure the glass ionomer is being used for, as a prolonged exposure to the atmosphere could interfere with the ratio of chemicals in the liquid. At the stage of mixing, a spatula should be used to rapidly incorporate the powder into the liquid for a duration of 45–60 seconds depending on manufacture instructions and the individual products.

Once mixed together to form a paste, an acid-base reaction occurs which allows the glass ionomer complex to set over a certain period of time and this reaction involves four overlapping stages:

- Dissolution
- Gelation
- Hardening (3–6 min)
- Maturation (24 hr – 1 yr)

Glass ionomers have a long setting time and need protection from the oral environment in order to minimize interference with dissolution and prevent contamination.

The type of application for glass ionomers depends on the cement consistency as varying levels of viscosity from very high viscosity to low viscosity, can determine whether the cement is used as luting agents, orthodontic bracket adhesives, pit and fissure sealants, liners and bases, core build-ups, or intermediate restorations.

=== Clinical uses ===
The different clinical uses of glass ionomer compounds as restorative materials include;

- Cermets, which are essentially metal reinforced, glass ionomer cements, used to aid in restoring tooth loss as a result of decay or cavities to the tooth surfaces near the gingival margin, or the tooth roots, though cermets can be incorporated at other sites on various teeth, depending on the function required. They maintain adhesion to enamel and dentine and have an identical setting reaction to other glass ionomers. The development of cermets is an attempt to improve the mechanical properties of glass ionomers, particularly brittleness and abrasion resistance by incorporating metals such as silver, tin, gold and titanium. The use of these materials with glass ionomers appears to increase the value of compressive strength and fatigue limit as compared to conventional glass ionomer, however there is no marked difference in the flexural strength and resistance to abrasive wear as compared to glass ionomers.
- Dentine surface treatment, which can be performed with glass ionomer cements as the cement has adhesive characteristics which may be useful when placed in undercut cavities. The surfaces on which the glass cement ionomers are placed would be adequately prepared by removing the precipitated salivary proteins, present from saliva as this would greatly reduce the receptiveness of the glass ionomer cement and dentine surface, to bond formation. A number of different substances can be used to remove this element, such as citric acid, however the most effective substance seems to be polyacrylic acid, which is applied to the tooth surface for 30 seconds before it is washed off. The tooth is then dried to ensure the surface is receptive to bond formation but care is taken to ensure desiccation does not occur.
- Matrix techniques with glass ionomers, which are used to aid in proximal cavity restorations of anterior teeth. Between the teeth that are adjacent to the cavity, the matrix is inserted, commonly before any dentine surface conditioning. Once the material is inserted in excess, the matrix is placed around the tooth root and kept in place with the help of firm digital pressure while the material sets. Once set, the matrix can be carefully removed using a sharp probe or excavator.
- Fissure sealants, which involve the use of glass ionomers as the materials can be mixed to achieve a certain fluid consistency and viscosity that allows the cement to sink into fissures and pits located in posterior teeth and fill these spaces which pose as a site for caries risk, thereby reducing the risk of caries manifesting.
- Orthodontic brackets, which can involve the use of glass ionomer cements as an adhesive cement that forms strong chemical bonds between the enamel and the many metals which are used in orthodontic brackets such as stainless steel.
- Fluoride varnishes have been combined with sealant application in the prevention of dental caries. There is low certainty evidence that the combined usage of both increases the overall effectiveness as compared to using fluoride varnish alone.

== Chemistry and setting reaction ==
All GICs contain a basic glass and an acidic polymer liquid, which set by an acid-base reaction. The polymer is an ionomer, containing a small proportion – some 5 to 10% – of substituted ionic groups. These allow it to be acid decomposable and clinically set readily.

The glass filler is generally a calcium alumino fluorosilicate powder, which upon reaction with a polyalkenoic acid gives a glass polyalkenoate-glass residue set in an ionised, polycarboxylate matrix.

The acid base setting reaction begins with the mixing of the components. The first phase of the reaction involves dissolution. The acid begins to attack the surface of the glass particles, as well as the adjacent tooth substrate, thus precipitating their outer layers but also neutralising itself. As the pH of the aqueous solution rises, the polyacrylic acid begins to ionise, and becoming negatively charged it sets up a diffusion gradient and helps draw cations out of the glass and dentine. The alkalinity also induces the polymers to dissociate, increasing the viscosity of the aqueous solution.

The second phase is gelation, where as the pH continues to rise and the concentration of the ions in solution to increase, a critical point is reached and insoluble polyacrylates begin to precipitate. These polyanions have carboxylate groups whereby cations bind them, especially Ca^{2+} in this early phase, as it is the most readily available ion, crosslinking into calcium polyacrylate chains that begin to form a gel matrix, resulting in the initial hard set, within five minutes. Crosslinking, H bonds and physical entanglement of the chains are responsible for gelation. During this phase, the GIC is still vulnerable and must be protected from moisture. If contamination occurs, the chains will degrade and the GIC lose its strength and optical properties. Conversely, dehydration early on will crack the cement and make the surface porous.

Over the next twenty four hours maturation occurs. The less stable calcium polyacrylate chains are progressively replaced by aluminium polyacrylate, allowing the calcium to join the fluoride and phosphate and diffuse into the tooth substrate, forming polysalts, which progressively hydrate to yield a physically stronger matrix.

The incorporation of fluoride delays the reaction, increasing the working time. Other factors are the temperature of the cement, and the powder to liquid ratio – more powder or heat speeding up the reaction.

GICs have good adhesive relations with tooth substrates, uniquely chemically bonding to dentine and, to a lesser extend, to enamel. During initial dissolution, both the glass particles and the hydroxyapatite structure are affected, and thus as the acid is buffered the matrix reforms, chemically welded together at the interface into a calcium phosphate polyalkenoate bond. In addition, the polymer chains are incorporated into both, weaving cross links, and in dentine the collagen fibres also contribute, both linking physically and H-bonding to the GIC salt precipitates. There is also microretention from porosities occurring in the hydroxyapatite.

Works employing non-destructive neutron scattering and terahertz (THz) spectroscopy have evidenced that GIC's developing fracture toughness during setting is related to interfacial THz dynamics, changing atomic cohesion and fluctuating interfacial configurations. Setting of GICs is non-monotonic, characterised by abrupt features, including a glass–polymer coupling point, an early setting point, where decreasing toughness unexpectedly recovers, followed by stress-induced weakening of interfaces. Subsequently, toughness declines asymptotically to long-term fracture test values.

== Glass ionomer cement as a permanent material ==
=== Fluoride release and remineralisation ===
The pattern of fluoride release from glass ionomer cement is characterised by an initial rapid release of appreciable amounts of fluoride, followed by a taper in the release rate over time. An initial fluoride "burst" effect is desirable to reduce the viability of remaining bacteria in the inner carious dentin, hence, inducing enamel or dentin remineralization. The constant fluoride release during the following days are attributed to the fluoride ability to diffuse through cement pores and fractures. Thus, continuous small amounts of fluoride surrounding the teeth reduces demineralization of the tooth tissues. A study by Chau et al. shows a negative correlation between acidogenicity of the biofilm and the fluoride release by GIC, suggestive that enough fluoride release may decrease the virulence of cariogenic biofilms. In addition, Ngo et al. (2006) studied the interaction between demineralised dentine and Fuji IX GP which includes a strontium – containing glass as opposed to the more conventional calcium-based glass in other GICs. A substantial amount of both strontium and fluoride ions was found to cross the interface into the partially demineralised dentine affected by caries. This promoted mineral depositions in these areas where calcium ion levels were low. Hence, this study supports the idea of glass ionomers contributing directly to remineralisation of carious dentine, provided that good seal is achieved with intimate contact between the GIC and partly demineralised dentine. This, then raises a question, "Is glass ionomer cement a suitable material for permanent restorations?" due to the desirable effects of fluoride release by glass ionomer cement.

=== Glass Ionomer Cement in Primary Teeth ===
Numerous studies and reviews have been published with respect to GIC used in primary teeth restorations. Findings of a systematic review and meta-analysis suggested that conventional glass ionomers were not recommended for Class II restorations in primary molars. This material showed poor anatomical form and marginal integrity, and composite restorations were shown to be more successful than GIC when good moisture control could be achieved. Resin modified glass ionomer cements (RMGIC) were developed to overcome the limitations of the conventional glass ionomer as a restorative material. A systematic review supports the use of RMGIC in small to moderate sized class II cavities, as they are able to withstand the occlusal forces on primary molars for at least one year. With their desirable fluoride releasing effect, RMGIC may be considered for Class I and Class II restorations of primary molars in high caries risk population.

=== Glass Ionomer Cement in Permanent Teeth ===
With regard to permanent teeth, there is insufficient evidence to support the use of RMGIC as long term restorations in permanent teeth. Despite the low number of randomised control trials, a meta- analysis review by Bezerra et al. [2009] reported significantly fewer carious lesions on the margins of glass ionomer restorations in permanent teeth after six years as compared to amalgam restorations. In addition, adhesive ability and longevity of GIC from a clinical standpoint can be best studied with restoration of non- carious cervical lesions. A systematic review shows GIC has higher retention rates than resin composite in follow up periods of up to 5 years. Unfortunately, reviews for Class II restorations in permanent teeth with glass ionomer cement are scarce with high bias or short study periods. However, a study [2003] of the compressive strength and the fluoride release was done on 15 commercial fluoride- releasing restorative materials. A negative linear correlation was found between the compressive strength and fluoride release (r^{2}=0.7741), i.e., restorative materials with high fluoride release have lower mechanical properties.
