= Demineralization (physiology) =

Opposite process of mineralization

Demineralization is the opposite process of mineralization; it is a process of reduction in the mineral content in tissue or an organism. Examples include bone demineralization or tooth demineralization. Demineralization can lead to serious diseases such as osteoporosis, rickets, or tooth decay.

Usually, treatment involves administration of appropriate dietary supplements to help restore the remineralization of human tissues and their physiological state.

== See also ==
- Bone resorption
- Bone remodeling
