= Dental sealant =

Dental treatment to prevent tooth decay

Pit and fissure caries

Dental sealants (also termed pit and fissure sealants, or simply fissure sealants) are a dental treatment intended to prevent tooth decay. Teeth have recesses on their biting surfaces; the back teeth have fissures (grooves) and some front teeth have cingulum pits. It is these pits and fissures that are most vulnerable to tooth decay because food and bacteria stick in them and because they are hard-to-clean areas. Dental sealants are materials placed in these pits and fissures to fill them in, creating a smooth surface which is easy to clean. Dental sealants are mainly used in children who are at higher risk of tooth decay, and are usually placed as soon as the adult molar teeth come through.

== Background ==
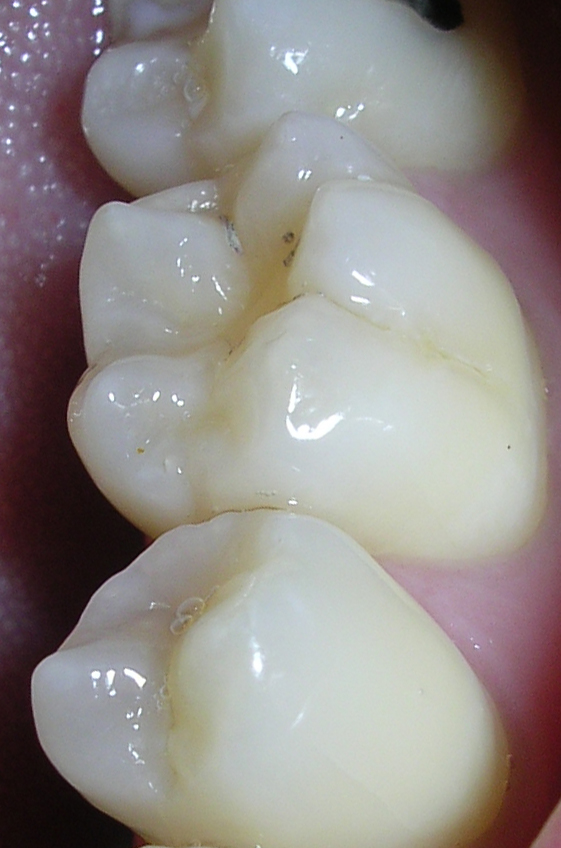
Back teeth showing fissure system

Dental caries is an upset of the balance between loss and gain of minerals from a tooth surface. The loss of minerals from the teeth occurs from the bacteria within the mouth, fermenting foods and producing acids, whereas the tooth gains minerals from our saliva and fluoride that is present within the mouth. When this balance is skewed due to frequent intake of fermentable carbohydrates, poor oral hygiene, and lack of fluoride consumption, there is a continuous loss and little gain of minerals over a long period of time, which can ultimately cause what is known as tooth decay.

Dental sealants are a preventive treatment that is part of the minimal intervention dentistry approach to dental care. These sealants are a plastic material placed in the pits and fissures (the recesses on the chewing surfaces) of primary (baby) or permanent (adult) molar and premolar teeth at the back of the mouth. These molar teeth are considered the most susceptible teeth to dental caries due to the anatomy of the chewing surfaces of these teeth, which inhibits protection from saliva and fluoride and instead favours plaque accumulation. This approach facilitates prevention and early intervention, in order to prevent or stop the dental caries process before it reaches the ends stage of the disease, which is also known as the "hole" or cavitation of a tooth. Once the tooth is cavitated, it requires a dental restoration in order to repair the damage, which emphasizes the importance of prevention in preserving teeth for a lifetime of chewing.

Preventing tooth decay from the pits and fissures of the teeth is achieved by dental sealants providing a physical barricade to protect natural tooth surfaces and grooves, inhibiting build-up of bacteria and food trapped within such fissures and grooves. Dental sealants also provide a smooth surface that is easily accessible for both the natural protective factor, saliva and the toothbrush bristles when cleaning the teeth. As dental sealants are clear or white, they are only visible upon close inspection.

Multiple oral health care professionals including dentists, dental therapists, dental hygienists, oral health therapists and dental assistants (in some states in the US) are able to apply dental sealants to teeth.

== History ==
There have been many attempts made within past decades to prevent the development of caries, in particular occlusal caries as it was once generally accepted that pits and fissures of teeth would become infected with bacteria within 10 years of erupting into the mouth. G.V. Black, the creator of modern dentistry, informed that more than 40% of caries incidences in permanent teeth occurred in pits and fissures due to being able to retain food and plaque.

One of the first attempts to prevent occlusal caries occurred as early as 1905 by Willoughby D. Miller. Miller, a pioneer of dentistry, was applying silver nitrate to surfaces of teeth, chemically treating the biofilm with its antibacterial functions against both Streptococcus mutans and Actinomyces naeslundii, which are both carious pathogens. Silver nitrate, which was also being practiced by H. Klein and J.W. Knutson in the 1940s, was being used in attempt to prevent and arrest occlusal caries.

In 1921, T.P. Hyatt, a pioneer researcher, was the first person to recommend prophylactic odontotomy (preventive operation). This procedure involved creating Class 1 cavity preps of teeth that were considered at risk of developing occlusal caries, which included all pits and fissures. The widening of the pits and fissures were then filled with amalgam.

C.F Bödecker, a dentist and researcher, also made attempts to prevent occlusal caries. Initially, in 1926 Bödecker would use a large round bur to smooth out the fissures. 1929, Bödecker attempted to prevent occlusal caries by cleaning the pit and fissures with an explorer and then sealing the pits and fissures with dental cement, such as oxyphosphate cement. Bödecker then later became an advocator for prophylactic odontotomy procedures (preventive operations).

It was in 1955, that M.G. Buonocore gave insight to the benefits of etching enamel with phosphoric acid. His studies demonstrated that resin could be bonded to enamel through acid etching, increasing adhesion whilst also creating an improved marginal integrity of resin restorative material. It was this bonding system that led to the future successful creation of fissure sealants.

In 1966, E.I. Cueto created the first sealant material, which was methyl cyanoacrylate. However, this material was susceptible to bacterial breakdown over time, therefore was not an acceptable sealing material. Bunonocore made further advances in 1970 by developing bisphenol-a glycidyl dimethacrylate, which is a viscous resin commonly known as BIS-GMA. This material was used as the basis for many resin-based sealant/composite material developments in dentistry, as it is resistant to bacterial breakdown and forms a steady bond with etched enamel.

In 1974, glass ionomer cement fissure seals (GIC) were introduced by J.W. McLean and A.D. Wilson.

== Modern sealant materials ==
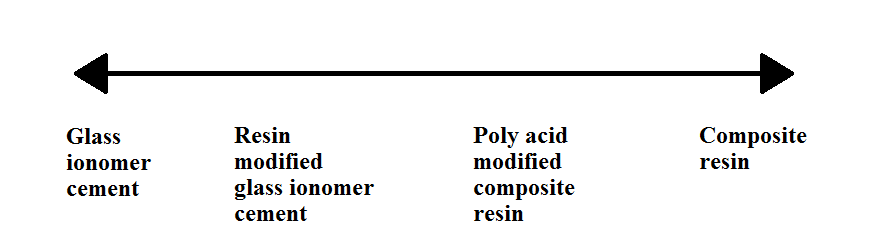
Glass ionomer cement – composite resin spectrum of restorative materials used in dentistry. Towards the GIC end of the spectrum, there is increasing fluoride release and increasing acid-base content; towards the composite resin end of the spectrum, there is increasing light cure percentage and increased flexural strength.

Modern dental sealants generally are either resin based or glass ionomer based.

=== Resin based sealants ===
It is customary to refer to the development of resin based sealants in generations:

1. First generation: set with UV curing. They are no longer marketed.
2. Second generation: chemical-curing (autopolymerized).
3. Third generation: visible light-cured.
4. Fourth generation: contain fluoride.

As part of the wider debate over the safety of bisphenol A (BPA), concerns have been raised over the use of resin based sealants. BPA is a xenoestrogen, i.e. it mimics the relative bioactivity of estrogen, a female sex hormone. Pure BPA is rarely present in dental sealants, however they may contain BPA derivatives. There is very little research about the potential estrogen-like effects of BPA derivatives. A transient presence of BPA in saliva has been reported immediately following placement of some resin based sealants. The longest duration of salivary BPA was 3 hours after placement, so there is little risk of chronic low-dose BPA exposure. The currently available evidence suggests that there is no risk of estrogen-like side effects with resin based sealants. Several national dental organizations have published position statements regarding the safety of resin based dental materials, e.g. the American Dental Association, the Australian Dental Association, the British Dental Association, and the Canadian Dental Association.

=== Glass ionomer sealants ===
GIC materials bond both to enamel and dentine after being cleaned with polyacrylic acid conditioner. Some other advantages GICs have is that they contain fluoride and are less moisture sensitive, with suggestions being made that despite having poor retention, they may prevent occlusal caries even after the sealant has fallen out due to their ability to release fluoride.

=== Resin based sealants versus glass ionomer sealants ===
It was shown that GIC materials were more effective in prevention of development of caries despite the higher non-successful rate compared to resin based sealants. This may be accounted for due to the fluoride-releasing property of GIC which increases salivary fluoride level that may aid in preventing dental caries.

Resin-based sealants are normally the preferred choice of material for denture sealants. GIC material may be used as a provisional protective material when there are concerns regarding adequate moisture control.

=== Effectiveness ===
Dental sealants are accepted as an effective preventive method for cavities and as long as the sealant remains adhered to the tooth, cavities can be prevented. It is for this reason that sealant success is now measured by the length of time a sealant remains on the tooth, rather than the decay experienced in sealed and unsealed teeth. The ability of a pit and fissure sealant to prevent dental caries is highly dependent on its ability to retain on the tooth surface.

It has been demonstrated that the use of adhesive systems before applying dental sealants improves retention. Traditional retention of a sealant on tooth surface is through acid etching.

The most common reason for sealant failure is salivary contamination during sealing placement. Other factors include clinician inexperience, lack of client co-operation, and less effective sealant material used.

Sealants may be applied in conjunction with fluoride varnish as a preventive method which is shown to be more successful (low certainty evidence) than fluoride varnish alone.

Various factors can help contribute to the retention of fissure sealants. These include:

- Isolation of teeth from saliva
- Not placing sealants on partially erupted teeth as there is gingival tissue on the crown
- Good operator techniques
- Preparation of the fissure by cleaning out plaque and debris prior to placement

=== Longevity ===
Although dental sealants do wear naturally and may become damaged over time, they usually last for around five to ten years, despite the heavy pressures endured by teeth during chewing each day. Longevity of dental sealants is also dependent on the type of material used. It is not uncommon for dental sealants to be retained well into adulthood. It is believed that bacteria and food particles may eventually become entrapped under dental sealants, and can thus cause decay in the very teeth intended to be protected. Dental sealants are inspected during routine dental visits to ensure that they are retained in the fissures of the teeth. Damaged sealants can simply be repaired by adding new sealant material. One of the major causes of the loss of sealants in the first year is salivary contamination.

On the basis of limited evidence both GIC and resin materials are equally acceptable in caries prevention, however retention rates between GIC and Resin have been shown to differ. Resin has been shown to be the superior product for retention. A 2-year clinical trial comparing GIC and Resin for dental sealants demonstrated that the GIC had a total loss rate of 31.78%, in contrast to the resin which had a total loss rate of 5.96% The study did acknowledge that GIC had its therapeutic advantages other than retention, this included the benefit of fluoride release and its use on partially erupted teeth. Though GIC has poorer retention rates, the fact that they release active fluoride in the surrounding enamel is very important. They can exert a cariostatic effect and increased release of fluoride, and for these reasons GIC is more of a fluoride vehicle rather than a traditional fissure sealant. All three materials are as effective as each other if the correct techniques are used to complete the procedure.

== Indications and contraindications ==
Although dental sealants are recommended to be placed in all children as soon as possible following eruption of permanent molars there are specific indications for when they are required to be placed. These indications mainly stem from issues that would cause a patient to be considered high caries risk, in order to prevent dental caries.

These indications are:

- Patients who are at increased risk of caries due to factors such as poor oral hygiene, lack of exposure to fluoride, previous and present caries experience, any current orthodontic treatment
- High sugar diet which increases the patient's susceptibility to dental caries
- Teeth with enamel defects such as MIH, although the enamel defects may make it difficult to bond dental sealants to the tooth it is still essential that these teeth are sealed as the poor quality enamel makes then more susceptible to dental decay
- Patients with complicated medical history e.g. patients with underlying systemic diseases as these could increase the patient's caries risk possibly due to having dry mouth as a result of medications or having prolonged treatment which could affect a patient's ability to undertake adequate oral hygiene and maintain a low sugar diet
- Early carious lesions can be treated with dental sealants in order to prevent invasive dental restorations. Dental sealants as treatment would be appropriate for occlusal caries which extend no more than a third of the way through dentine in the primary dentition and enamel lesions in the permanent dentition
- Dental sealants can also be indicated for dental defects such as dens in dente, amelogenesis imperfecta and deep fissures on lateral incisors

There are no specific contraindications to placing dental sealants. For resin fissure sealants to be successful excellent moisture control is needed during placement of the fissure sealant. In cases where moisture control cannot be achieved, Glass Ionomer fissure sealants should be placed until a time when moisture control is adequate enough to place resin fissure sealants.

== Comprehensive preventive care in children ==
In Pediatric dentistry, sealants can be included in comprehensive preventive care together with fluoride varnish, toothbrushing, and dietary counseling. During a preventive visit, after examination and cleaning, a child may have fluoride varnish or a sealant applied to protect against tooth decay. The comprehensive approach combines professional procedures and daily preventive measures, rather than viewing sealant placement as the sole intervention.

== Clinical procedure ==
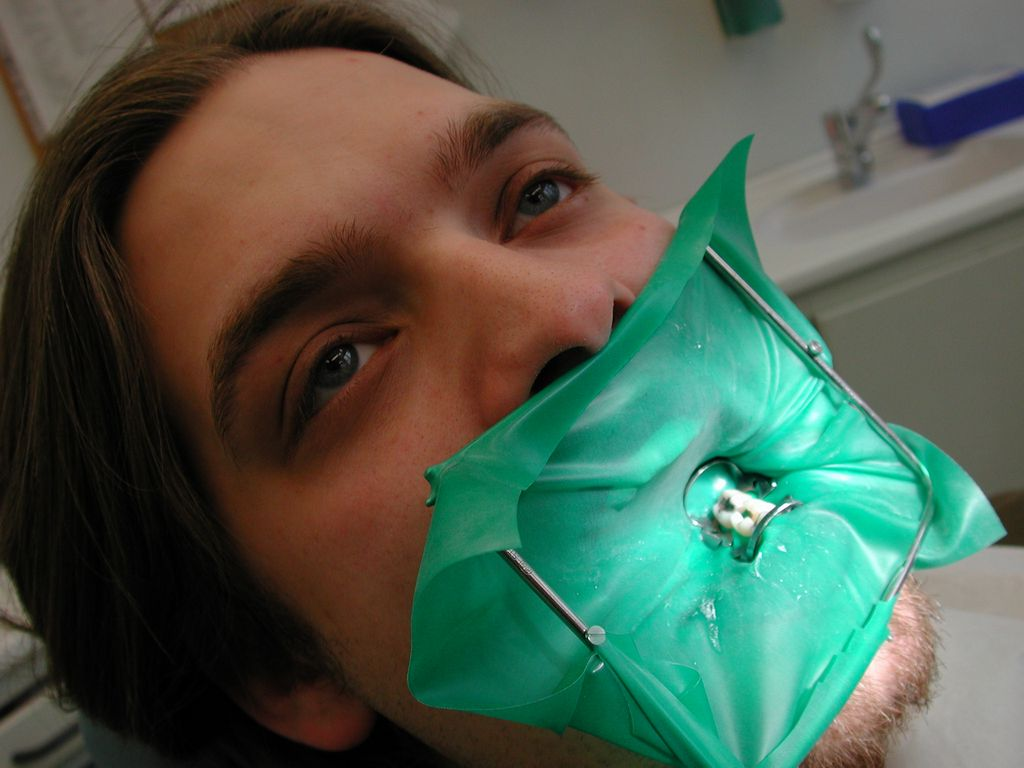
Dental dam

The exact technique depends on the material used and a good application technique will increase retention, which means sealants can last longer on the teeth. Generally, each quadrant is treated separately by using four-handed technique with an assistant and to follow the manufacturer's recommendations. The patient should wear safety glasses for protection from chemicals and curing light. Once the patient is prepared, the surface of the tooth must be cleaned to allow maximum contact of the etch and the dental sealant with the enamel surface. A rubber dam may be used to prevent saliva from contaminating the intended site to be sealed, although often these are not used, especially for younger children. Moisture control is more of an issue with resin based sealants than with glass ionomer sealants. The surface is cleaned and dried.

Resin sealants require a phosphoric acid solution ("etch") to create microscopic porosity into which the sealant material can flow thereby increasing retention, increasing surface area and improving the strength of the bond between the sealant and the tooth surface. Etching time varies from 15 to 60 seconds, depending on the product. After that, the tooth must be rinsed and dried thoroughly for 15 to 20 seconds. Chalky appearance on the dried tooth means the tooth has been properly etched. If the tooth does not have this chalky appearance, the etching process must be repeated. The sealant is then applied to the tooth by carefully placing the sealant material into the prepared pits and fissures by using a disposable instrument provided by the manufacturer. Overfilling on the tooth should be prevented to minimize occlusal adjustment. The material is left for 10 seconds after the placement prior to curing to allow optimum penetration of the sealant material into the pores created by the etching procedure. Finally, the sealant is hardened by a curing light, which usually takes 20 to 30 seconds. Glass ionomer does not require light curing, however it will set faster with the usage of a curing light.

Resin-based sealants require an absolutely dry surface until polymerization is complete, so it is essential to avoid salivary contamination of the sealant site. A rubber dam or cotton roll isolation technique can be used to isolate the sealant site from saliva which is the common reason for sealant failure. Glass ionomer sealants have the advantage of not needing a dry field to be effective. In fact, the application procedure for glass ionomers can involve pressing a saliva-moistened finger onto the occlusal surface to push the sealant material into the pits and fissures.

Compared to a typical dental filling, where an injection of local anesthetic and the use of a dental drill may be involved, the application of dental sealants is significantly less invasive and generally considered quick and easy. The procedure is entirely painless, although a minor level of discomfort may be experienced by the patient. The etching gel may temporarily leave a sour taste in the mouth.

Pits and fissure sealants are used as effective controls in preventing caries. Sealants create a barrier which removes the biofilm from the occlusal surface. There are 4 sealant materials that can be used for the purpose of sealing pits and fissures. The materials are:

Resin-based sealant

- Often made up of bis-GMA
- Polymerised by light
- These sealants can be colourless, tinted or white

Glass-ionomer (GI)

- Has fluoride releasing properties

Polyacid-modified resin sealants

- Combination of resin based materials found in resin sealants and fluoride-releasing adhesive properties of GI

Resin-modified glass ionomer sealants

- Longer working time than GI

Historically methods such as; zinc phosphate cement, mechanical fissure eradication, prophylactic odontotomy, or chemical treatment with silver nitrate, were used to seal pits and fissures. These techniques are no longer used in modern-day practice. Placement techniques for sealants rely on the type of material being used. However a common factor for all is that moisture control must be achieved. The maintenance of moisture control increases the treatment time and could be counter productive.

=== Resin Based Sealants Application Technique ===
- Ensure the tooth is free from any debris using a toothbrush or cotton wool roll.
- Isolate the tooth from any moisture - this can be done using whatever the clinician finds appropriate; cotton wool rolls, dry guard, saliva ejector. Using cotton wool rolls, dry guards or a saliva ejector will give optimum isolation of the site. A rubber dam may be used to prevent saliva from contaminating the intended site to be sealed, although often these are not used, especially for younger children. Moisture control is more of an issue with resin based sealants than with glass ionomer sealants
- Dry the tooth and etch the surface of the tooth that will be carrying the sealant - resin sealants require a phosphoric acid solution ("etch") to create microscopic porosity into which the sealant material can flow thereby increasing retention, increasing surface area and improving the strength of the bond between the sealant and the tooth surface. Etching time varies from 15 to 60 seconds, depending on the product.
- Wash the etch with water and once again dry the tooth aiming to avoid any moisture contamination. A chalky appearance of the dried tooth means the tooth has been properly etched. If the tooth does not have this chalky appearance, the etching process must be repeated.
- Apply the resin to the surface ensuring sufficient material has been applied to cover all areas
- The sealant should now be light cured, this hardens the sealant
- Check the integrity of the sealant with a probe. May need to check occlusion with articulating paper and reduce sealant height.
- If the sealant cannot be picked off, application is successful. These sealants should be checked at recall appointments and re-applied as required.

=== GI Sealant Technique ===
For partially erupted teeth which are difficult to isolate some will use GIC (doesn't need etching) as an interim option. GIC may have an advantage of fluoride release.

- Ensure the tooth is free from any debris using a toothbrush or cotton wool roll.
- Isolate the tooth from any moisture
- Dry the tooth
- Etch is not required for this technique
- Have the GI sealant mixed
- GI can be applied into fissures in several ways: using an excavator or using a finger
- Following the application of sealant in the clinicians chosen way, a small amount if petroleum jelly should be applied to the sealant. Glass ionomer does not require light curing, however it will set faster with the usage of a curing light.
- Ensure the sealant is not high in occlusion and removes any visible excess. These sealants should be checked at recall appointments and re-applied as required

== Prevalence ==
=== North America ===
In the United States, 42% of children aged 6–11 and 48% of adolescents aged 12–19 had fissure sealants on permanent teeth during 2011–2016. In Canada, these numbers are around 32% and 51% respectively.

=== Europe ===
In Greece, in a study from 2011, 8.3% of 12 year olds and only 8% of 15 year olds had at least one dental sealant on a molar tooth. When sealants were applied, DMFS scores were reduced by 11% in the 12 year olds and 24% in the 15 year olds.

In Portugal, a study has shown that over half (58.8%) of adolescents had a fissure sealant applied on at least one tooth.

In Denmark, 66% of 15-year-old children had at least one sealed molar.

In the UK in 2003, 13% of 8 year olds, 25% of 12 year olds and 30% of 15 year olds had at least one fissure sealant. In Ireland, the rates were 47%, 70% and 69% comparatively.

In Slovenia, around 94% of 12 year olds have at least one sealed molar.

In the Netherlands, around two thirds of children aged 11 to 17 have at least one sealed molar.

=== Asia ===
Around 25% of Japanese children have at least one sealed molar.

A study surveying fissure sealants and dental caries in primary school girls in Saudi Arabia in 2017 found that only 1.3% of the children had at least 1 fissure sealant applied, but in another study, the overall figure was 9%.
