= Dental restoration =

Treatments to restore function, integrity, and morphology of teeth

- ICD-9-CM: 23.2-23.4

Dental restoration, dental fillings, or simply fillings are dentistry treatments used to restore the function, integrity, and morphology of tooth structure lost due to decay (caries), trauma, or wear. Fillings may also be used to replace or seal tooth structure around dental implants or after more extensive procedures such as root-canal therapy. There are two broad categories of fillings: direct restorations, placed and shaped directly inside a cleaned cavity in a single dental visit, and indirect restorations (such as inlays or onlays), which are fabricated outside the mouth (often in a laboratory) and then cemented into the tooth. Materials for direct fillings commonly include amalgam (metal) or tooth-colored composite and glass-ionomer, while indirect restorations may use ceramics, metal alloys or porcelain for greater durability and structural support.

== History ==
In Italy evidence dated to the Paleolithic, around 13,000 years ago, points to bitumen used to fill a tooth and in Neolithic Slovenia, 6500 years ago, beeswax was used to close a fracture in a tooth. Graeco-Roman literature, such as Pliny the Elder's Naturalis Historia (AD 23–79), contains references to filling materials for hollow teeth.

== Tooth preparation ==
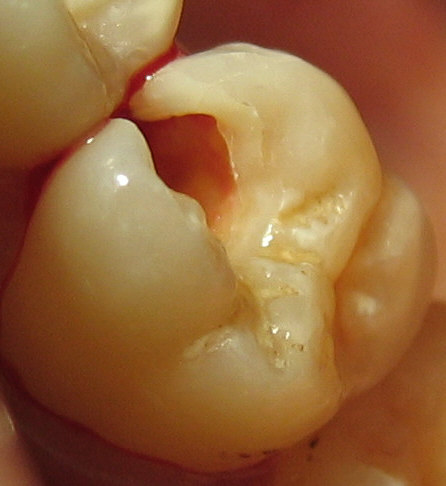
Tooth #3, the upper right first molar, with the beginning of a preparation. Looking into the preparation, the white, outer enamel appears intact, while the yellow, underlying dentin appears recessed. This is because the dentin was decayed and was thus removed. This portion of the enamel is now unsupported, and should be removed to prevent future fracture.

Restoring a tooth to good form and function requires two steps:

1. preparing the tooth for placement of restorative material or materials, and
2. placement of these materials.

The process of preparation usually involves cutting the tooth with a rotary dental handpiece and dental burrs, a dental laser, or through air abrasion (or in the case of atraumatic restorative treatment, hand instruments), to make space for the planned restorative materials and to remove any dental decay or portions of the tooth that are structurally unsound. If permanent restoration cannot be carried out immediately after tooth preparation, temporary restoration may be performed.

The prepared tooth, ready for placement of restorative materials, is generally called a tooth preparation. Materials used may be gold, amalgam, dental composites, glass ionomer cement, or porcelain, among others.

Preparations may be intracoronal or extracoronal. Intracoronal preparations are those which serve to hold restorative material within the confines of the structure of the crown of a tooth. Examples include all classes of cavity preparations for composite or amalgam as well as those for gold and porcelain inlays. Intracoronal preparations are also made as female recipients to receive the male components of removable partial dentures. Extracoronal preparations provide a core or base upon which restorative material will be placed to bring the tooth back into a functional and aesthetic structure. Examples include crowns and onlays, as well as veneers.

In preparing a tooth for a restoration, a number of considerations will determine the type and extent of the preparation. The most important factor to consider is decay. For the most part, the extent of the decay will define the extent of the preparation, and in turn, the subsequent method and appropriate materials for restoration.

Another consideration is unsupported tooth structure. When preparing the tooth to receive a restoration, unsupported enamel is removed to allow for a more predictable restoration. While enamel is the hardest substance in the human body, it is particularly brittle, and unsupported enamel fractures easily.

A systematic review concluded that for decayed baby (primary) teeth, putting an off‐the‐shelf metal crown over the tooth (Hall technique) or only partially removing decay (also referred to as "selective removal") before placing a filling may be better than the conventional treatment of removing all decay before filling. For decayed adult (permanent) teeth, partial removal (also referred to as "selective removal") of decay before filling the tooth, or adding a second stage to this treatment where more decay is removed after several months, may be better than conventional treatment.

== Direct restorations ==
This technique involves placing a soft or malleable filling into the prepared tooth and building up the tooth. The material is then set hard and the tooth is restored. Where a wall of the tooth is missing and needs to be rebuilt, a matrix should be used before placing the material to recreate the shape of the tooth, so it is cleansable and to prevent the teeth from sticking together. Sectional matrices are generally preferred to circumferential matrices when placing composite restorations in that they favour the formation of a contact point. This is important to reduce patient complaints of food impaction between the teeth. However, sectional matrices can be more technique sensitive to use, so care and skill is required to prevent problems occurring in the final restoration. The advantage of direct restorations is that they are usually set quickly and can be placed in a single procedure. The dentist has a variety of different filling options to choose from. A decision is usually made based on the location and severity of the associated cavity. Since the material is required to set while in contact with the tooth, limited energy (heat) is passed to the tooth from the setting process.

== Indirect restorations ==
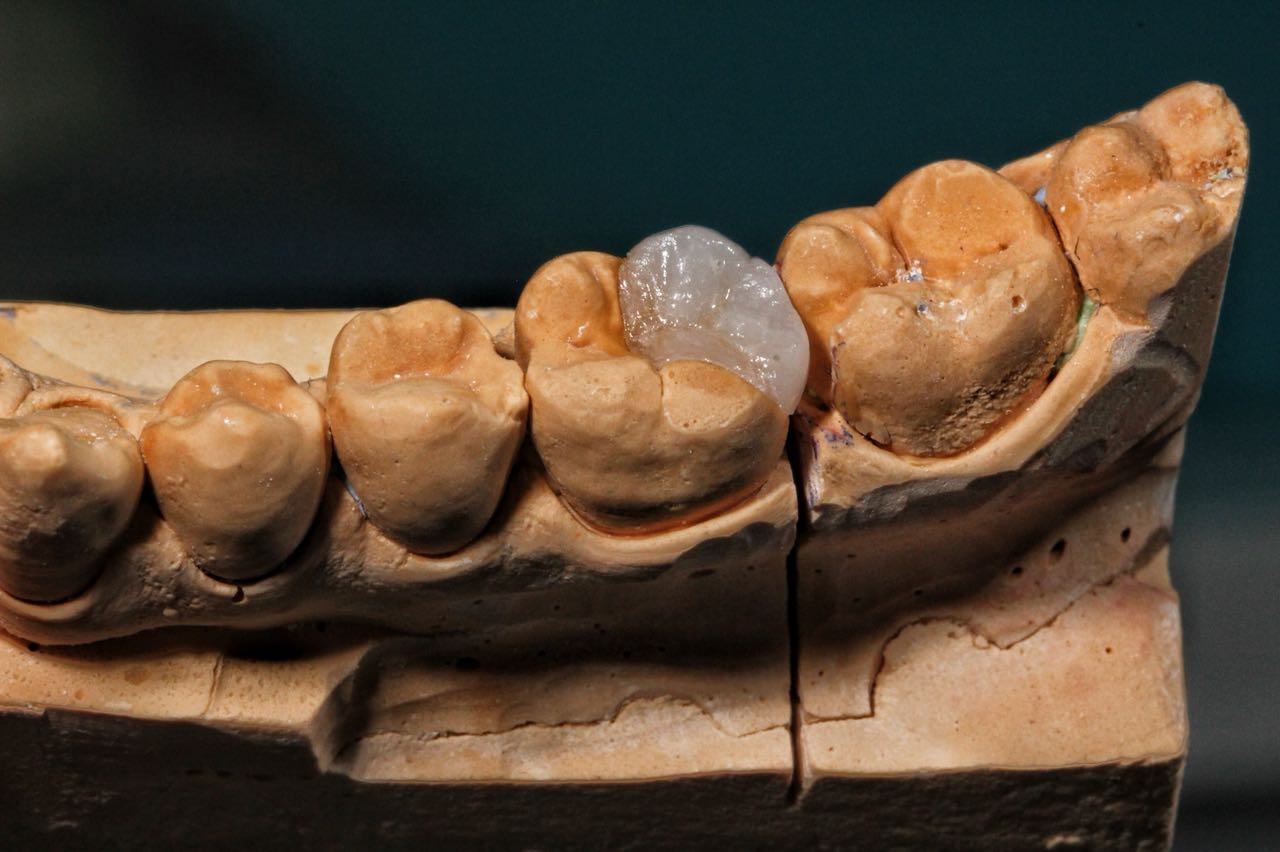
An indirect restoration fabricated on model from Ips emax ceramic ready to be cemented on natural tooth structure

In this technique the restoration is fabricated outside of the mouth using the dental impressions of the prepared tooth. Common indirect restorations include inlays and onlays, crowns, bridges, and veneers. Usually a dental technician fabricates the indirect restoration from records the dentist has provided. The finished restoration is usually bonded permanently with a dental cement. It is often done in two separate visits to the dentist. Common indirect restorations are done using gold or ceramics.

While the indirect restoration is being prepared, a provisory/temporary restoration is sometimes used to cover the prepared tooth to help maintain the surrounding dental tissues.

Removable dental prostheses (mainly dentures) are sometimes considered a form of indirect dental restoration, as they are made to replace missing teeth. There are numerous types of precision attachments (also known as combined restorations) to aid removable prosthetic attachment to teeth, including magnets, clips, hooks, and implants which may themselves be seen as a form of dental restoration.

The CEREC method is a chairside CAD/CAM restorative procedure. An optical impression of the prepared tooth is taken using a camera. Next, the specific software takes the digital picture and converts it into a 3D virtual model on the computer screen. A ceramic block that matches the tooth shade is placed in the milling machine. An all-ceramic, tooth-colored restoration is finished and ready to bond in place.

Another fabrication method is to import STL and native dental CAD files into CAD/CAM software products that guide the user through the manufacturing process. The software can select the tools, machining sequences and cutting conditions optimized for particular types of materials, such as titanium and zirconium, and for particular prostheses, such as copings and bridges. In some cases, the intricate nature of some implants requires the use of 5-axis machining methods to reach every part of the job.

== Cavity classifications ==
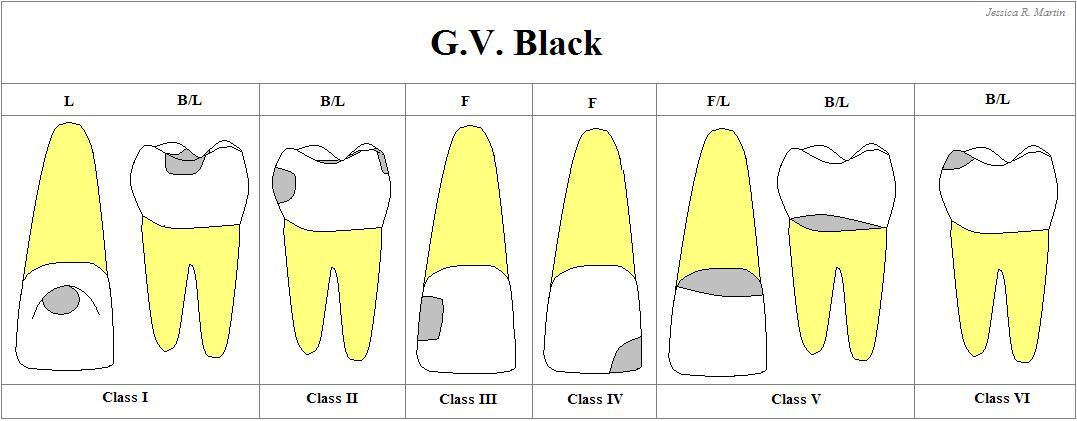
GV Black Classification of Restorations

Greene Vardiman Black classification:

G.V. Black classified the cavities depending on their site:

- Class I Caries affecting pit and fissure, on occlusal, buccal, and lingual surfaces of molars and premolars, and palatal of maxillary incisors.
- Class II Caries affecting proximal surfaces of molars and premolars.
- Class III Caries affecting proximal surfaces of centrals, laterals, and cuspids.
- Class V Caries affecting gingival 1/3 of facial or lingual surfaces of anterior or posterior teeth.
- Class VI Caries affecting cusp tips of molars, premolars, and cuspids.

Graham J. Mount's classification:

Mount classified cavities depending on their site and size. The proposed classification was designed to simplify the identification of lesions and to define their complexity as they enlarge.

Site:

- Pit/Fissure: 1
- Contact area: 2
- Cervical: 3

Size:

- Minimal: 1
- Moderate: 2
- Enlarged: 3
- Extensive: 4

== Materials used ==
=== Alloys ===
The following casting alloys are mostly used for making crowns, bridges and dentures. Titanium, usually commercially pure but sometimes a 90% alloy, is used as the anchor for dental implants as it is biocompatible and can integrate into bone.

Precious metallic alloys

- gold (high purity: 99.7%)
- gold alloys (with high gold content)
- gold-platina alloy
- silver-palladium alloy

Base metallic alloys

- cobalt-chrome alloy
- nickel-chrome alloy

=== Amalgam ===
Amalgams are alloys formed by a reaction between two or more metals, one of which is mercury. It is a hard restorative material and is silvery-grey in colour. One of the oldest direct restorative materials still in use, dental amalgam was widely used in the past with a high degree of success, although recently its popularity has declined due to a number of reasons, including the development of alternative bonded restorative materials, increase in demand for more aesthetic restorations and public perceptions concerning the potential health risks of the material.

The composition of dental amalgam is controlled by the ISO Standard for dental amalgam alloy (ISO 1559). The major components of amalgam are silver, tin and copper. Other metals and small amounts of minor elements such as zinc, mercury, palladium, platinum and indium are also present. Earlier versions of dental amalgams, known as 'conventional' amalgams consisted of at least 65 wt% silver, 29 wt% tin, and less than 6 wt% copper. Improvements in the understanding of the structure of amalgam post-1986 gave rise to copper-enriched amalgam alloys, which contain between 12 wt% and 30 wt% copper and at least 40 wt% silver. The higher level of copper improved the setting reaction of amalgam, giving greater corrosion resistance and early strength after setting.

Possible indications for amalgam are for load-bearing restorations in medium to large sized cavities in posterior teeth, and in core build-ups when a definitive restoration will be an indirect cast restoration such as a crown or bridge retainer. Contraindications for amalgam are if aesthetics are paramount to patient due to the colour of the material. Amalgams should be avoided if the patient has a history of sensitivity to mercury or other amalgam components. Besides that, amalgam is avoided if there is extensive loss of tooth substance such that a retentive cavity cannot be produced, or if excessive removal of health tooth substance would be required to produce a retentive cavity.

Advantages of amalgam include durability - if placed under ideal conditions, there is evidence of good long term clinical performance of the restorations. Placement time of amalgam is shorter compared to that of composites and the restoration can be completed in a single appointment. The material is also more technique-forgiving compared to composite restorations used for that purpose. Dental amalgam is also radiopaque which is beneficial for differentiating the material between tooth tissues on radiographs for diagnosing secondary caries. The cost of the restoration is typically cheaper than composite restorations.

Disadvantages of amalgam include poor aesthetic qualities due to its colour. Amalgam does not bond to tooth easily, hence it relies on mechanical forms of retention. Examples of this are undercuts, slots/grooves or root canal posts. In some cases this may necessitate excessive amounts of healthy tooth structure to be removed. Hence, alternative resin-based or glass-ionomer cement-based materials are used instead for smaller restorations including pit and small fissure caries. There is also a risk of marginal breakdown in the restorations. This could be due to corrosion which may result in "creep" and "ditching" of the restoration. Creep can be defined as the slow internal stressing and deformation of amalgam under stress. This effect is reduced by incorporating copper into amalgam alloys. Some patients may experience local sensitivity reactions to amalgam.

Although the mercury in cured amalgam is not available as free mercury, concern of its toxicity has existed since the invention of amalgam as a dental material. It is banned or restricted in Norway, Sweden and Finland. See dental amalgam controversy.

=== Direct gold ===
Direct gold fillings were practiced during the times of the Civil War in America. Although rarely used today, due to expense and specialized training requirements, gold foil can be used for direct dental restorations.

=== Composite resin ===
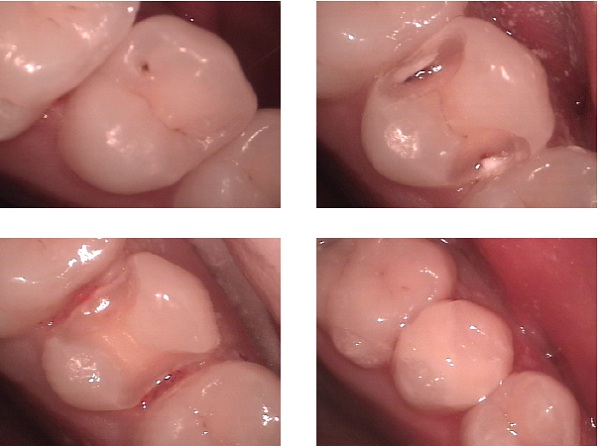
Dental restoration using composite bonding

Dental composites, commonly described to patients as "tooth-colored fillings", are a group of restorative materials used in dentistry. They can be used in direct restorations to fill in the cavities created by dental caries and trauma, minor buildup for restoring tooth wear (non-carious tooth surface loss) and filling in small gaps between teeth (labial veneer). Dental composites are also used as indirect restoration to make crowns and inlays in the laboratory.

These materials are similar to those used in direct fillings and are tooth-colored. Their strength and durability is not as high as porcelain or metal restorations and they are more prone to wear and discolouration. As with other composite materials, a dental composite typically consists of a resin-based matrix, which contains a modified methacrylate or acrylate. Two examples of such commonly used monomers include bisphenol A-glycidyl methacrylate (BISMA) and urethane dimethacrylate (UDMA), together with tri-ethylene glycol dimethacrylate (TEGMA). TEGMA is a comonomer which can be used to control viscosity, as Bis GMA is a large molecule with high viscosity, for easier clinical handling. Inorganic filler such as silica, quartz or various glasses, are added to reduce polymerization shrinkage by occupying volume and to confirm radio-opacity of products due to translucency in property, which can be helpful in diagnosis of dental caries around dental restorations. The filler particles give the composites wear resistance as well. Compositions vary widely, with proprietary mixes of resins forming the matrix, as well as engineered filler glasses and glass ceramics. A coupling agent such as silane is used to enhance the bond between resin matrix and filler particles. An initiator package begins the polymerization reaction of the resins when external energy (light/heat, etc.) is applied. For example, camphorquinone can be excited by visible blue light with critical wavelength of 460-480 nm to yield necessary free radicals to start the process.

After tooth preparation, a thin primer or bonding agent is used. Modern photo-polymerised composites are applied and cured in relatively thin layers as determined by their opacity. After some curing, the final surface will be shaped and polished.

=== Glass ionomer cement ===
A glass ionomer cement (GIC) is a class of materials commonly used in dentistry as direct filling materials and/or for luting indirect restorations. GIC can also be placed as a lining material in some restorations for extra protection. These tooth-coloured materials were introduced in 1972 for use as restorative materials for anterior teeth (particularly for eroded areas).

The material consists of two main components: Liquid and powder. The liquid is the acidic component containing polyacrylic acid and tartaric acid (added to control the setting characteristics). The powder is the basic component consisting of sodium alumino-silicate glass. The desirable properties of glass ionomer cements make them useful materials in the restoration of carious lesions in low-stress areas such as smooth-surface and small anterior proximal cavities in primary teeth.

Advantages of using glass ionomer cement:

- The addition of tartaric acid to GIC leads to a shortened setting time, hence providing better handling properties. This makes it easier for the operator to use the material in clinic.
- GIC does not require bond, it can bond to enamel and dentine without the need for use of an intermediate material. Conventional GIC also has a good sealing ability providing little leakage around restoration margins and reducing the risk of secondary caries.
- GIC contains and releases fluoride after being placed therefore it helps in preventing carious lesions in teeth.
- It has good thermal properties as the expansion under stimulus is similar to dentine.
- The material does not contract on setting meaning it is not subject to shrinkage and microleakage.
- GIC is also less susceptible to staining and colour change than composite.

Disadvantages of using Glass ionomer cement:

- GIC have poor wear resistance, they are usually weak after setting and are not stable in water however this improves when time goes on and progression reactions take place. Due to their low strength GICs are not appropriate to be placed in cavities in areas which bear an increase amount of occlusal load or wear.
- The material is susceptible to moisture when it is first placed.
- GIC varies in translucency therefore it can have poor aesthetics, especially noticeable if placed on anterior teeth.

Resin Modified Glass Ionomer

Resin modified glass ionomer was developed to combine the properties of glass ionomer cement with composite technology. It comes in a powder-liquid form. The powder contains fluro-alumino-silicate glass, barium glass (provides radiopacity), potassium persulphate (a redox catalyst to provide resin cure in the dark) and other components such as pigments. The liquid consists of HEMA (water miscible resin), polyacrylic acid (with pendant methacrylate groups) and tartaric acid. This can undergo both acid base and polymerisation reactions. It also has photoinitiators present which enable light curing.

The ionomer has a number of uses in dentistry. It can be applied as fissure sealant, placed in endodontic access cavity as a temporary filling and a luting agent. It can also be used to restore lesions in both primary and permanent dentition. They are easier to use and are a very popular group of materials.

Advantages of using RMGIC:

- Provides a good bond to enamel and dentine.
- It has better physical properties than GIC.
- A Lower solubility in moisture.
- It also releases fluoride over time.
- Provided better translucency and aesthetics as compared to GIC.
- Better handling properties making it easier to use.

Disadvantages of using RMGIC:

- Polymerisation Contraction can cause microleakage around restoration margins
- It has an exothermic setting reaction which can cause potential damage to tooth tissue.
- The material swells due to uptake of water as HEMA is extremely hydrophilic.
- Monomer leaching : HEMA is toxic to the pulp therefore it must be polymerised completely.
- The strength of the material reduces if its not light-cured.

GIC and RMGIC are used in dentistry, there will be times when one of these materials is better than the other but that is dependent upon the clinical situation. However, in most cases the ease of use is deciding factor.

=== Compomer ===
Dental compomers are another type of white filling material although their use is not as widespread.

Compomers were formed by modifying dental composites with poly-acid in an effort to combine the desirable properties of dental composites, namely their good aesthetics, and glass ionomer cements, namely their ability to release fluoride over a long time. Whilst this combination of good aesthetics and fluoride release may seem to give compomers a selective advantage, their poor mechanical properties (detailed below) limits their use.

Compomers have a lower wear resistance and a lower compressive, flexural and tensile strength than dental composites, although their wear resistance is greater than resin-modified and conventional glass ionomer cements. Compomers cannot adhere directly to tooth tissue like glass ionomer cements; they require a bonding agent like dental composites.

Compomers may be used as a cavity lining material and a restorative material for non-load bearing cavities. In Paediatric dentistry, they can also be used as a fissure sealant material.

The luting version of compomer may be used to cement cast alloy and ceramic-metal restorations, and to cement orthodontic bands in Paediatric patients. However, compomer luting cement should not be used with all-ceramic crowns.

=== Porcelain (ceramics) ===
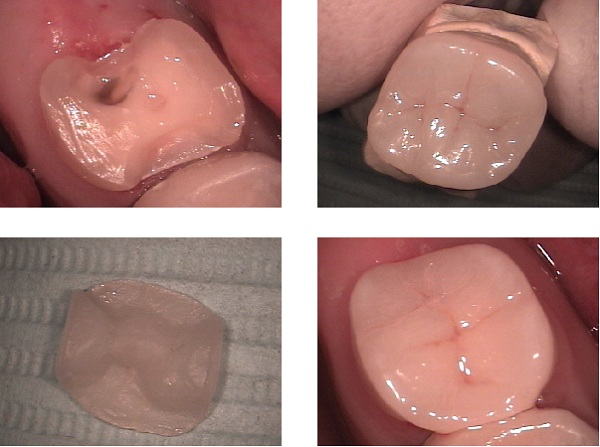
All-ceramic Dental Onlay for a molar tooth

Full-porcelain dental materials include dental porcelain (porcelain meaning a high-firing-temperature ceramic), other ceramics, sintered-glass materials, and glass-ceramics as indirect fillings and crowns or metal-free "jacket crowns". They are also used as inlays, onlays, and aesthetic veneers. A veneer is a very thin shell of porcelain that can replace or cover part of the enamel of the tooth. Full-porcelain restorations are particularly desirable because their color and translucency mimic natural tooth enamel.

Another type is known as porcelain-fused-to-metal, which is used to provide strength to a crown or bridge. These restorations are very strong, durable and resistant to wear, because the combination of porcelain and metal creates a stronger restoration than porcelain used alone.

One of the advantages of computerized dentistry (CAD/CAM technologies) involves the use of machinable ceramics which are sold in a partially sintered, machinable state that is fired again after machining to form a hard ceramic. Some of the materials used are glass-bonded porcelain (Vitablock), lithium disilicate glass-ceramic (a ceramic crystallizing from a glass by special heat treatment), and phase stabilized zirconia (zirconium dioxide, ZrO_{2}). Previous attempts to utilize high-performance ceramics such as zirconium-oxide were thwarted by the fact that this material could not be processed using the traditional methods used in dentistry. Because of its high strength and comparatively much higher fracture toughness, sintered zirconium oxide can be used in posterior crowns and bridges, implant abutments, and root dowel pins. Lithium disilicate (used in the latest Chairside Economical Restoration of Esthetic Ceramics CEREC product) also has the fracture resistance needed for use on molars. Some all-ceramic restorations, such as porcelain-fused-to-alumina set the standard for high aesthetics in dentistry because they are strong and their color and translucency mimic natural tooth enamel.

Cast metals and porcelain-on-metal were the standard material for crowns and bridges for long time. The full ceramic restorations are now the major choice of patients and are of commonly applied by dentists.

=== Comparison ===
- Composites and amalgam are used mainly for direct restoration. Composites can be made of color matching the tooth, and the surface can be polished after the filling procedure has been completed.
- Amalgam fillings expand with age, possibly cracking the tooth and requiring repair and filling replacement, but chance of leakage of filling is less.
- Composite fillings shrink with age and may pull away from the tooth allowing leakage. If leakage is not noticed early, recurrent decay may occur.
- A 2003 study showed that fillings have a finite lifespan: an average of 12.8 years for amalgam and 7.8 years for composite resins. Fillings fail because of changes in the filling, tooth or the bond between them. Secondary cavity formation can also affect the structural integrity the original filling. Fillings are recommended for small to medium-sized restorations.
- Inlays and onlays are more expensive indirect restoration alternative to direct fillings. They are supposed to be more durable, but long-term studies did not always detect a significantly lower failure rate of ceramic or composite inlays compared to composite direct fillings.
- Porcelain, cobalt-chrome, and gold are used for indirect restorations like crowns and partial coverage crowns (onlays). Traditional porcelains are brittle and are not always recommended for molar restorations. Some hard porcelains cause excessive wear on opposing teeth.

=== Experimental ===
The US National Institute of Dental Research and international organizations as well as commercial suppliers conduct research on new materials. In 2010, researchers reported that they were able to stimulate mineralization of an enamel-like layer of fluorapatite in vivo. Filling material that is compatible with pulp tissue has been developed; it could be used where previously a root canal or extraction was required, according to 2016 reports.

== Restoration using dental implants ==
Dental implants are anchors placed in bone, usually made from titanium or titanium alloy. They can support dental restorations which replace missing teeth. Some restorative applications include supporting crowns, bridges, or dental prostheses.

== Complications ==
=== Irritation of the nerve ===
When a deep cavity had been filled, there is a possibility that the nerve may have been irritated. This can result in short term sensitivity to cold and hot substances, and pain when biting down on the specific tooth. It may settle down on its own. If not, then alternative treatment such as root canal treatment may be considered to resolve the pain while keeping the tooth.

=== Weakening of tooth structure ===
In situations where a relatively larger amount of tooth structure has been lost or replaced with a filling material, the overall strength of the tooth may be affected. This significantly increases the risk of the tooth fracturing off in the future when excess force is placed on the tooth, such as trauma or grinding teeth at night, leading to cracked tooth syndrome.

== See also ==
- Dental curing light
- Dental dam
- Dental fear
- Dental braces
- Dental treatment
- Fixed prosthodontics
- Gold teeth
- Oral and maxillofacial surgery
- Oral and maxillofacial pathology
- Treatment of knocked-out (avulsed) teeth
