= Dental compomer =

Composite materials composed of an ion-leachable glass embedded in a polymeric matrix

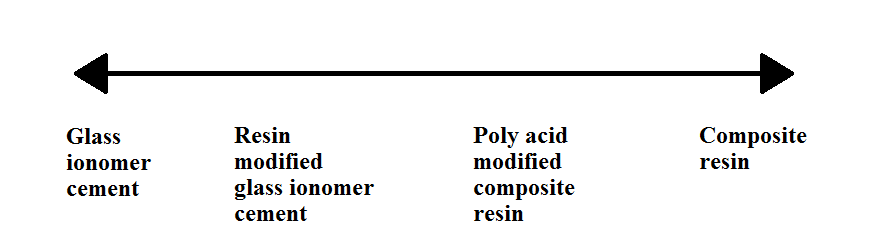
Glass ionomer cement - composite resin spectrum of restorative materials used in dentistry. Towards the GIC end of the spectrum, there is increasing fluoride release and increasing acid-base content; towards the composite resin end of the spectrum, there is increasing light cure percentage and increased flexural strength.

Dental compomers, also known as polyacid-modified resin composite, are used in dentistry as a filling material. They were introduced in the early 1990s as a hybrid of two other dental materials, dental composites and glass ionomer cement, in an effort to combine their desirable properties: aesthetics for dental composites (they are white and closely mimic tooth tissue, so can camouflage into a tooth very well) and the fluoride releasing ability for glass ionomer cements (helps to prevent further tooth decay).

== History ==
Compomers were introduced in the early 1990s. Previous available restorative materials included dental amalgam, glass ionomer cement, resin modified glass ionomer cement and dental composites.

== Composition ==
Compomers are resin-based materials like dental composites, and the components are largely the same.

The setting reaction is similarly a polymerisation process of resin monomers (e.g. urethane dimethacrylate) which have been modified by polyacid groups, and is induced by free radicals released from a photoinitiator such as camphorquinone. To induce the release of these free radicals, the photoinitiator must be exposed to a specific wavelength of light, blue light in the case of camphorquinone. There is a second less significant acid-base setting reaction which takes place after the light-cured polymerisation reaction; this setting reaction occurs as the compomer absorbs water from the oral environment.

Also in compomer is fluoroaluminosilicate glass which, when broken down by hydrogen ions through an acid-base reaction, releases fluoride. This process requires water absorbed from the oral environment. To aid water absorption and fluoride release, some of the resins in the compomer matrix are more hydrophilic (e.g. glycerol dimethacrylate).

The source of the hydrogen ions that break the fluoroaluminosilicate glass particles apart are certain resin monomers that have a carboxyl group attached. Some compomers instead source their hydrogen ions from a methacrylated polycarboxylic acid copolymer that is similarly used in some resin modified glass ionomer cements.

== Properties ==
=== Aesthetics ===
Compomers are tooth coloured materials, and so their aesthetics can immediately be seen as better than that of dental amalgams. It has been shown that ratings in various aesthetic areas are better for compomers than resin modified glass ionomer cements. Compomers are also available in various non-natural colours from various dental companies for use in deciduous teeth.

Compomers and resin-modified glass ionomers have better aesthetics than conventional glass ionomer cements.

=== Fluoride release ===
Compomers and glass ionomer cements can release fluoride. This property can be useful in cases where a patient has a higher risk of experience tooth decay in future.

Fluoride is a mineral which helps strengthen our teeth and protects them from decay, and it is found in many dental products including toothpaste. Compomers and glass ionomer cements are able to release fluoride over extended periods, and this may help to reduce the risk of a tooth decaying further. However, such a property does not negate the need for excellent oral hygiene to prevent oral disease. Compomers are recommended for patients at medium risk of developing dental caries.

There is conflicting evidence regarding the amount of fluoride compomers can release: Powers, Wataha and Chen (2017) state compomers do not release as much fluoride as glass ionomer cements because they have a lower concentration of fluoroaluminosilicate glass particles; there is supporting evidence to suggest compomers only release 10% of that of glass ionomer cement. On the other hand, Richard van Noort (2013) states that, due to recent developments, modern compomers are now capable of releasing the same amount of fluoride over the lifetime of the restoration as glass ionomer cements.

Emerging evidence has shown that compomers and glass ionomer cements are able to absorb fluoride from the oral environment when their own fluoride stores are depleted, a process described as 'recharging'. The material can then release this stored fluoride when the fluoride concentration in the oral environment falls, thus exposing the teeth to fluoride for longer. This recharging ability is not as effective in compomers as it is in glass ionomers cements. Nevertheless, this can further prevent the risk of tooth decay.

There is evidence to show compomers have no advantage over an amalgam restoration with a fluoride releasing bonding agent, which releases mercury and fluoride.

=== Polymerisation shrinkage ===
Compomers undergo some shrinkage during the setting reaction, and the extent of this polymerisation shrinkage is similar to that of dental composites.

=== Water uptake ===
Compomers absorb water more rapidly than dental composites due to the addition of hydrophilic resin monomers within the matrix (see Composition section above). As such, water equilibrium is reached within days rather than weeks, months or even years in the case of dental composite materials. This property has the advantage of compensating for the polymerisation shrinkage during the setting reaction, thus reducing any gap that develops at the cavity margins. However, it can also cause fracture of all-ceramic crowns when compomer is used as the luting cement. Therefore, it is not recommended to use the luting version of compomer for cementing all-ceramic crowns. More information on luting compomer can be found below.

=== Mechanical properties ===
Compomers have poorer mechanical properties than dental composites, with a lower compressive, flexural and tensile strength. Therefore, compomers are not an ideal material for load bearing restorations.

In terms of wear resistance, compomers wear less quickly than glass ionomer and resin modified glass ionomer cements, but do not perform as well as dental composites.

== Clinical application ==
=== Handling ===
Handling and ease of use of composites is generally seen as good by dental professionals. Compomers are available in both normal and flowable forms, with the manufacturers of the flowable compomers claiming that they have the ability to shape to the cavity without the need for hand instruments.

=== Adhesion to tooth tissue ===
Compomers do not bond to tooth tissue like glass ionomer cements; this is the same issue with dental composites. It is therefore essential to use bonding agents to aid adhesion of the compomer to tooth.

=== Finishing and polishing ===
The process of finishing and polishing compomers is similar to that of dental composites.

After finishing and polishing, compomers have a similar surface roughness to dental composites.

=== Indications for use ===
As a restorative material, compomers are limited to low-stress bearing situations (proximal and cervical restorations) due to their mechanical properties and wear resistance as detailed in the Properties section above.

Compomers can be used as a cavity lining material to provide pulpal protection.

Compomers are notable used in Paediatric dentistry. Possible uses include:

- As a restorative material, particularly for Class I and II cavities (see Dental restoration § Cavity classifications)
- Fissure sealants
- For cementation of orthodontic bands

=== Survival rate ===
Studies have shown compomers to have high survival rates 2-4 years following placement. Some issues that were identified 2-3 years after placement include discolouration around the restoration margins and loss of marginal integrity.

== Compomer luting cement ==
=== Composition ===
A powder and liquid are mixed together to form the luting cement.

The powder contains fluoroaluminosilicate glass particles, sodium fluoride, and self-cured and light-cured initiators.

The liquid contains poly-acid modified monomers and water. The carboxylic acid groups in the methacrylate-carboxylic acid monomer help with adhesion.

=== Properties ===
The advantages of compomer luting cement are listed below:

- Retentive
- Highbond strength
- High compressive strength
- High flexural strength
- High fracture toughness
- Low solubility
- Sustained fluoride release with the potential to act as a fluoride reservoir (recharges when it becomes depleted of fluoride, see 'Fluoride release' in Properties section above for more details)

The compressive and tensile strength of compomer cements are comparable to that of glass ionomer, resin-modified glass ionomer, and zinc polycarboxylate cements.

=== Indications for use ===
The use of the luting version of compomer is not recommended for all-ceramic crowns, nor as a core or filling material. See 'Water uptake' in Properties section above for more details. Compomer luting cement can however be used for cast alloy and ceramic-metal restorations.

== See also ==
- Dental restorative materials
- Dental composite
- Glass ionomer cement
