= Och =

Och may refer to:

- Och (spirit)
- The ISO 639-3 language code for Old Chinese
- 6-oxocamphor hydrolase, an enzyme
- Och, alternative spelling of Uch, a city in Bahawalpur District, Pakistan
- John R. Oishei Children's Hospital, Buffalo, New York, United States
- Outram Community Hospital, a community hospital in Singapore
