= Auguste Taveau =

Auguste Taveau (Louis Augustin Onésiphore Taveau) was a French dentist born in Le Havre, the 28th of August 1792. Date and place of his death are still unknown. In 1826, he was among the first to use amalgam as a dental restorative material, although he had originally developed it as early as 1816. He went on trying to improve the material.

== History ==
In 1816, Auguste Taveau developed his own dental amalgam from silver coins and mercury. This amalgam contained a very small amount of mercury and had to be heated in order for the silver to dissolve at an appreciable rate. Taveau's formula offered lower cost and greater ease of use compared to existing materials such as gold, but had many practical problems, including a tendency to significantly expand after setting. Because of these problems, this formula was abandoned in France. In 1833, however, two untrained Europeans, the Crawcour "brothers" (Edward Crawcour and his nephew Moses), brought Taveau's amalgam to the United States under the name "Royal Mineral Succedaneum".

The Parisian police knew that Taveau was a "pédérast" and that he had contracted syphilis. He was arrested after a denunciation to the police by a man called Émile Lagunière, who had previously been taken for an adopted child of Taveau. The forensic surgeon Ambroise Tardieu probably reported Lagunière case in his Étude medico-légale sur les attentats aux mœurs (obs. XXII). Taveau's subsequent fate is unknown.
