= Dental composite =

Substance used to fill cavities in teeth

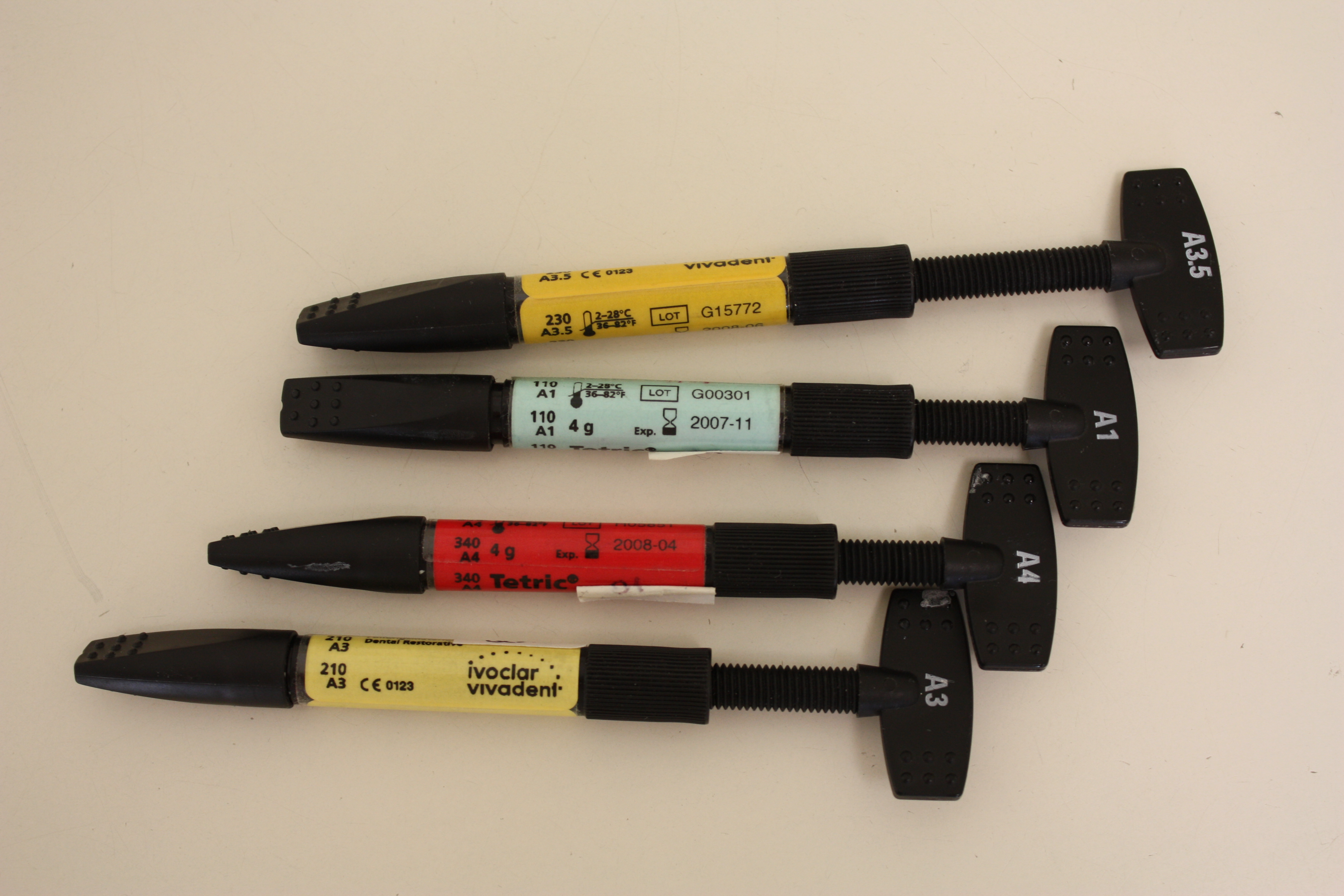
Dental composites.

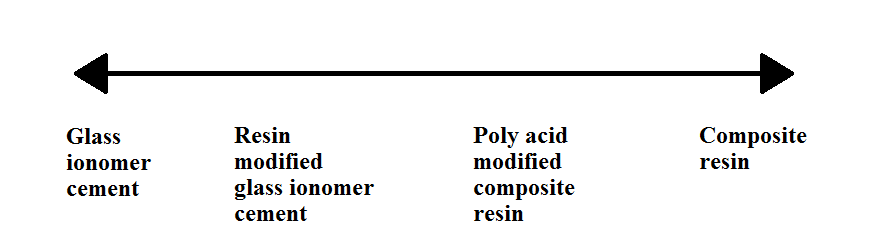
Glass ionomer cement - composite resin spectrum of restorative materials used in dentistry. Towards the GIC end of the spectrum, there is increasing fluoride release and increasing acid-base content; towards the composite resin end of the spectrum, there is increasing light cure percentage and increased flexural strength.

Dental composite resins (better referred to as "resin-based composites" or simply "filled resins") are dental cements made of synthetic resins. Synthetic resins evolved as restorative materials since they were insoluble, of good tooth-like appearance, insensitive to dehydration, easy to manipulate and inexpensive. Composite resins are most commonly composed of Bis-GMA and other dimethacrylate monomers (TEGMA, UDMA, HDDMA), a filler material such as silica and in most applications, a photoinitiator. Dimethylglyoxime is also commonly added to achieve certain physical properties such as flow-ability. Further tailoring of physical properties is achieved by formulating unique concentrations of each constituent.

Many studies have compared the lesser longevity of resin-based composite restorations to the longevity of silver-mercury amalgam restorations. Depending on the skill of the dentist, patient characteristics and the type and location of damage, composite restorations can have similar longevity to amalgam restorations. (See Longevity and clinical performance.) In comparison to amalgam, the appearance of resin-based composite restorations is far superior.

Resin-based composites are on the World Health Organization's List of Essential Medicines.

== History of use ==
Traditionally resin-based composites set by a chemical setting reaction through polymerization between two pastes. One paste containing an activator (not a tertiary amine, as these cause discolouration) and the other containing an initiator (benzoyl peroxide). To overcome the disadvantages of this method, such as a short working time, light-curing resin composites were introduced in the 1970s. The first light-curing units used ultra-violet light to set the material, however this method had a limited curing depth and was a high risk to patients and clinicians. Therefore, UV light-curing units were later replaced by visible light-curing systems employing camphorquinone as the photoinitiator.

=== Traditional period ===
In the late 1960s, composite resins were introduced as an alternative to silicates and unfulfilled resins, which were frequently used by clinicians at the time. Composite resins displayed superior qualities, in that they had better mechanical properties than silicates and unfulfilled resins. Composite resins were also seen to be beneficial in that the resin would be presented in paste form and, with convenient pressure or bulk insertion technique, would facilitate clinical handling. The faults with composite resins at this time were that they had poor appearance, poor marginal adaptation, difficulties with polishing, difficulty with adhesion to the tooth surface, and occasionally, loss of anatomical form.

=== Microfilled period ===
In 1978, various microfilled systems were introduced into the European market. These composite resins were appealing, in that they were capable of having an extremely smooth surface when finished. These microfilled composite resins also showed a better clinical colour stability and higher resistance to wear than conventional composites, which favoured their tooth tissue-like appearance as well as clinical effectiveness. However, further research showed a progressive weakness in the material over time, leading to micro-cracks and step-like material loss around the composite margin. In 1981, microfilled composites were improved remarkably with regard to marginal retention and adaptation. It was decided, after further research, that this type of composite could be used for most restorations provided the acid etch technique was used and a bonding agent was applied.

=== Hybrid period ===
Hybrid composites were introduced in the 1980s and are more commonly known as resin-modified glass ionomer cements (RMGICs). The material consists of a powder containing a radio-opaque fluoroaluminosilicate glass and a photoactive liquid contained in a dark bottle or capsule. The material was introduced, as resin composites on their own were not suitable for Class II cavities. RMGICs can be used instead. This mixture or resin and glass ionomer allows the material to be set by light activation (resin), allowing a longer working time. It also has the benefit of the glass ionomer component releasing fluoride and has superior adhesive properties. RMGICs are now recommended over traditional GICs for basing cavities. There is a great difference between the early and new hybrid composites.

Initially, resin-based composite restorations in dentistry were very prone to leakage and breakage due to weak compressive strength. In the 1990s and 2000s, such composites were greatly improved and have a compression strength sufficient for use in posterior teeth.

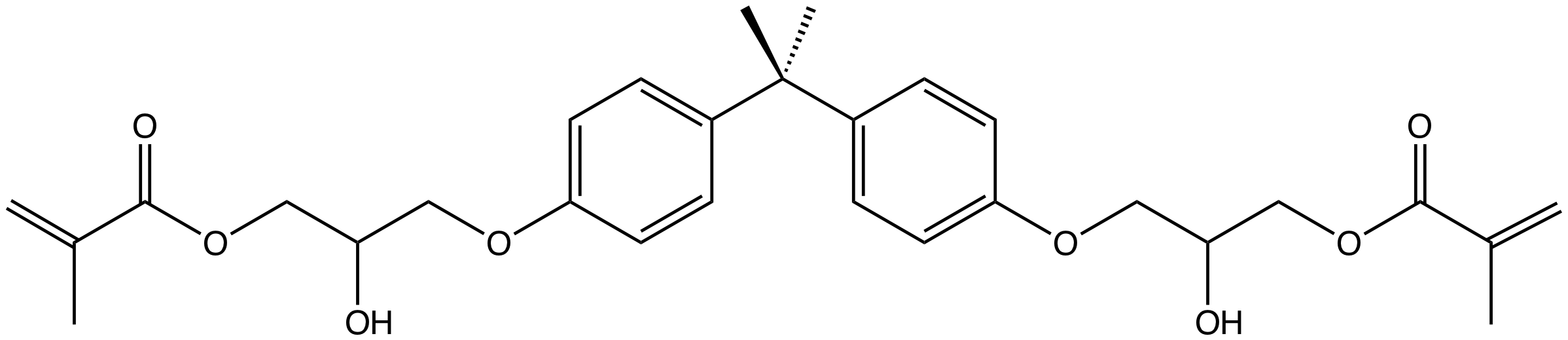
Chemical structure of bis-GMA (bisphenol A-glycidyl methacrylate), bearing two polymerizable groups, it is prone to form a crosslinked polymer that is used in dental restorations.

== Method and clinical application ==
Today's composite resins have low polymerization shrinkage and low coefficients of thermal shrinkage, which allows them to be placed in bulk while maintaining good adaptation to cavity walls. The placement of composite requires meticulous attention to procedure or it may fail prematurely. The tooth must be kept perfectly dry during placement or the resin will likely fail to adhere to the tooth. Composites are placed while still in a soft, dough-like state, but when exposed to light of a certain blue wavelength (typically 470 nm), they polymerize and harden into the solid filling (for more information, see Light activated resin). It is challenging to harden all of the composite, since the light often does not penetrate more than 2–3 mm into the composite. If too thick an amount of composite is placed in the tooth, the composite will remain partially soft, and this soft unpolymerized composite could ultimately lead to leaching of free monomers with potential toxicity and/or leakage of the bonded joint leading to recurring dental pathology. The dentist should place composite in a deep filling in numerous increments, curing each 2–3 mm section fully before adding the next. In addition, the clinician must be careful to adjust the bite of the composite filling, which can be tricky to do. If the filling is too high, even by a subtle amount, that could lead to chewing sensitivity on the tooth. A properly placed composite is comfortable, of good appearance, strong and durable, and could last 10 years or more.

The most desirable finish surface for a composite resin can be provided by aluminum oxide disks. Classically, Class III composite preparations were required to have retention points placed entirely in dentin. A syringe was used for placing composite resin because the possibility of trapping air in a restoration was minimized. Modern techniques vary, but conventional wisdom states that because there have been great increases in bonding strength due to the use of dentin primers in the late 1990s, physical retention is not needed except for the most extreme of cases. Primers allow the dentin's collagen fibers to be "sandwiched" into the resin, resulting in a superior physical and chemical bond of the filling to the tooth. Indeed, composite usage was highly controversial in the dental field until primer technology was standardized in the mid to late 1990s. The enamel margin of a composite resin preparation should be beveled in order to improve the appearance and expose the ends of the enamel rods for acid attack. The correct technique of enamel etching prior to placement of a composite resin restoration includes etching with 30%-50% phosphoric acid and rinsing thoroughly with water and drying with air only. In preparing a cavity for restoration with composite resin combined with an acid etch technique, all enamel cavosurface angles should be obtuse angles. Contraindications for composite include varnish and zinc oxide-eugenol. Composite resins for Class II restorations were not indicated because of excessive occlusal wear in the 1980s and early 1990s. Modern bonding techniques and the increasing unpopularity of amalgam filling material have made composites more attractive for Class II restorations. Opinions vary, but composite is regarded as having adequate longevity and wear characteristics to be used for permanent Class II restorations. Whether composite materials last as long or have similar leakage and sensitivity properties when compared to Class II amalgam restorations was described as a matter of debate in 2008.

== Composition ==
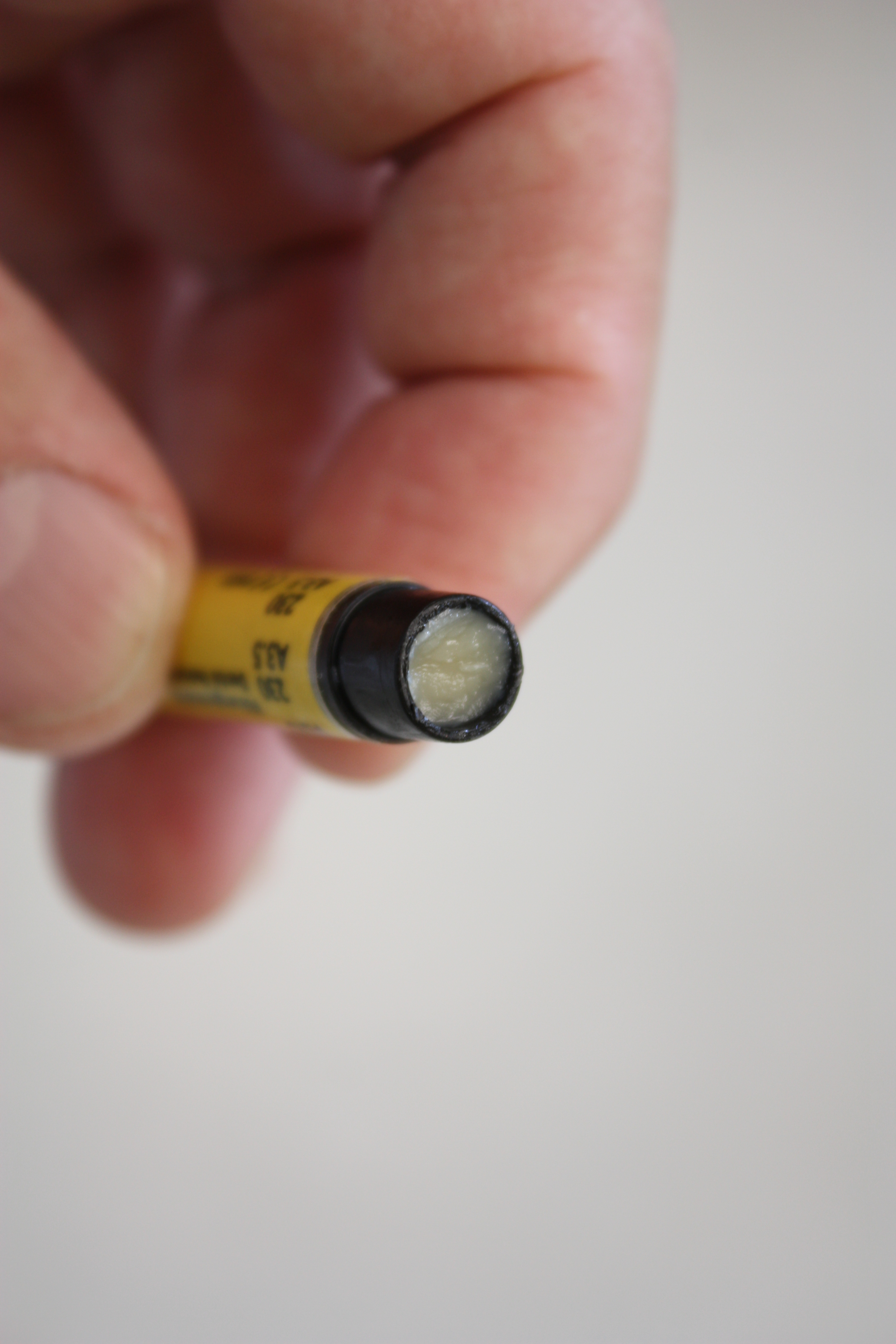
Dental composite resin.

As with other composite materials, a dental composite typically consists of a resin-based oligomer matrix, such as a bisphenol A-glycidyl methacrylate (BISGMA), urethane dimethacrylate (UDMA) or semi-crystalline polyceram (PEX), and an inorganic filler such as silicon dioxide (silica). Without a filler the resin wears easily, exhibits high shrinkage and is exothermic. Compositions vary widely, with proprietary mixes of resins forming the matrix, as well as engineered filler glasses and glass ceramics. The filler gives the composite greater strength, wear resistance, decreased polymerisation shrinkage, improved translucency, fluorescence and colour, and a reduced exothermic reaction on polymerisation. It also however causes the resin composite to become more brittle with an increased elastic modulus. Glass fillers are found in multiple different compositions allowing an improvement on the optical and mechanical properties of the material. Ceramic fillers include zirconia-silica and zirconium oxide.

Matrices such as BisHPPP and BBP, contained in the universal adhesive BiSGMA, have been demonstrated to increase the cariogenicity of bacteria leading to the occurrence of secondary caries at the composite-dentin interface. BisHPPP and BBP cause an increase of glycosyltransferase in S. mutans bacteria, which results in increased production of sticky glucans that allow S.mutans' adherence to the tooth. This results in a cariogenic biofilms at the interface of composite and tooth. The cariogenic activity of bacteria increases with concentration of the matrix materials. BisHPPP has furthermore been shown to regulate bacterial genes, making bacteria more cariogenic, thus compromising the longevity of composite restorations. Researchers are highlighting the need for new composite materials to be developed which eliminate the cariogenic products contained in composite resin and universal adhesives.

A coupling agent such as silane is used to enhance the bond between these two components. An initiator package (such as: camphorquinone (CQ), phenylpropanedione (PPD) or Lucirin (TPO)) begins the polymerization reaction of the resins when blue light is applied. Various additives can control the rate of reaction.

=== Filler types and particle size ===
Resin filler can be made of glasses or ceramics. Glass fillers are usually made of crystalline silica, silicon dioxide, lithium/barium-aluminium glass, and borosilicate glass containing zinc/strontium/lithium. Ceramic fillers are made of zirconia-silica, or zirconium oxide.

Fillers can be further subdivided based on their particle size and shapes such as:

==== Macrofilled filler ====
Macrofilled fillers have a particle size ranging from 5 - 10 μm. They have good mechanical strength but poor wear resistance. Final restoration is difficult to polish adequately leaving rough surfaces, and therefore this type of resin is plaque retentive.

==== Microfilled filler ====
Microfilled fillers are made of colloidal silica with a particle size of 0.4 μm. Resin with this type of filler is easier to polish compared to macrofilled. However, its mechanical properties are compromised as filler load is lower than in conventional (only 40-45% by weight). Therefore, it is contraindicated for load-bearing situations, and has poor wear resistance.

==== Hybrid filler ====
Hybrid filler contains particles of various sizes with filler load of 75-85% by weight. It was designed to get the benefits of both macrofilled and microfilled fillers. Resins with hybrid filler have reduced thermal expansion and higher mechanical strength. However, it has higher polymerisation shrinkage due to a larger volume of diluent monomer which controls viscosity of resin.

==== Nanofilled filler ====
Nanofilled composite has a filler particle size of 20-70 nm Nanoparticles form nanocluster units and act as a single unit. They have high mechanical strength similar to hybrid material, high wear resistance, and are easily polished. However, nanofilled resins are difficult to adapt to the cavity margins due to high volume of filler.

==== Bulk filler ====
Bulk filler is composed of non-agglomerated silica and zirconia particles. It has nanohybrid particles and filler load of 77% by weight. Designed to decrease clinical steps with possibility of light curing through 4-5mm incremental depth, and reduce stress within remaining tooth tissue. Unfortunately, it is not as strong in compression and has decreased wear resistance compared to conventional material.

Recently, nanohybrid fillers have seen wide interest.

== Advantages ==
Advantages of composites:

- Appearance: The main advantage of a direct dental composite over traditional materials such as amalgam is improved tooth tissue-mimicry. Composites can be in a wide range of tooth colors allowing near invisible restoration of teeth. Composite fillings can be closely matched to the color of existing teeth. Aesthetics are especially critical in anterior teeth region - see Aesthetic anterior composite restorations.
- Bonding to tooth structure: Composite fillings micro-mechanically bond to tooth structure. This strengthens the tooth's structure and restores its original physical integrity. The discovery of acid etching (producing enamel irregularities ranging from 5-30 micrometers in depth) of teeth to allow a micro-mechanical bond to the tooth allows good adhesion of the restoration to the tooth. Very high bond strengths to tooth structure, both enamel and dentin, can be achieved with dentin bonding agents.
- Tooth-sparing preparation: The fact that composite fillings are glued (bonded) to the tooth means that unlike amalgam fillings, there is no need for the dentist to create retentive features destroying healthy tooth. Unlike amalgam, which just fills a hole and relies on the geometry of the hole to retain the filling, composite materials are bonded to the tooth. In order to achieve the necessary geometry to retain an amalgam filling, the dentist may need to drill out a significant amount of healthy tooth material. In the case of a composite restoration, the geometry of the hole (or "box") is less important because a composite filling bonds to the tooth. Therefore less healthy tooth needs to be removed for a composite restoration.
- Less-costly and more conservative alternative to dental crowns: In some situations, a composite restoration may be offered as a less-expensive (though possibly less durable) alternative to a dental crown, which can be a very expensive treatment. Installation of a dental crown usually requires removal of significant healthy tooth material so the crown can fit over or into the natural tooth. Composite restoration conserves more of the natural tooth.
- Alternative to tooth removal: As a composite restoration bonds to the tooth and can restore the original physical integrity of a damaged or decayed tooth, in some cases composite restoration can preserve a tooth that might not be salvageable with amalgam restoration. For example, depending on the location and extent of decay, it might not be possible to create a void (a "box") of the geometry necessary to retain an amalgam filling.
- Versatility: Composite fillings can be used to repair chipped, broken or worn teeth which would not be repairable using amalgam fillings.
- Repairability: In many cases of minor damage to a composite filling, the damage can be easily repaired by adding additional composite. An amalgam filling might require complete replacement.
- Longer working time: The light-curing composite allows the on-demand setting and longer working time to some degree for the operator compared to amalgam restoration.
- Reduced quantity of mercury released to the environment: Composites avoid mercury environmental contamination associated with dentistry. When amalgam fillings are drilled for height adjustment, repair or replacement, some mercury-containing amalgam is inevitably washed down drains. (See Dental amalgam controversy - Environmental impact) When amalgam fillings are prepared by dentists, improperly disposed excess material may enter landfills or be incinerated. Cremation of bodies containing amalgam fillings releases mercury into the environment. (See Dental amalgam controversy - Cremation)
- Reduced mercury exposure for dentists: Preparing new amalgam fillings and drilling into existing amalgam fillings exposes dentists to mercury vapor. Use of composite fillings avoids this risk, unless the procedure also involves removing an existing amalgam filling. A review article found studies indicating that dental work involving mercury may be an occupational hazard with respect to reproductive processes, glioblastoma (brain cancer), renal function changes, allergies and immunotoxicological effects. (See Dental amalgam controversy - Health effects for dentists)
- Lack of corrosion: Although corrosion is no longer a major problem with amalgam fillings, resin composites do not corrode at all. (Low-copper amalgams, prevalent before 1963, were more subject to corrosion than modern high-copper amalgams. )

== Disadvantages ==
- Composite shrinkage and secondary caries: In the past, composite resins suffered significant shrinkage during curing, which led to inferior bonding interface. Shrinkage permits microleakage, which, if not caught early, can cause secondary caries (subsequent decay), the most significant dental disadvantage of composite restoration. In a study of 1,748 restorations, risk of secondary caries in the composite group was 3.5 times risk of secondary caries in the amalgam group. Good dental hygiene and regular checkups can mitigate this disadvantage. Most microhybrid and nanohybrid composites have a polymerization shrinkage that ranges from 2% to 3.5%. Composite shrinkage can be reduced by altering the molecular and bulk composition of the resin. In the field of dental restorative materials, reduction of composite shrinkage has been achieved with some success. Among the newest materials, silorane resin exhibits lower polymerization shrinkage, compared to the dimethacrylates.
- Durability: In some situations, composite fillings may not last as long as amalgam fillings under the pressure of chewing, particularly if used for large cavities. (See Longevity and clinical performance, below.)
- Chipping: Composite materials can chip off the tooth.
- Skill and training required: Successful outcomes in direct composite fillings is related to the skills of the practitioner and technique of placement. For example, a rubber dam is rated as being important for achieving longevity and low fracture rates similar to amalgam in the more demanding proximal Class II cavities.
- Need to keep working area in mouth completely dry: The prepared tooth must be completely dry (free of saliva and blood) when the resin material is being applied and cured. Posterior teeth (molars) are difficult to keep dry. Keeping the prepared tooth completely dry can also be difficult for any work involving treatment of cavities at or below the gumline, though techniques have been described to facilitate this.
- Time and expense: Due to the sometimes complicated application procedures and the need to keep the prepared tooth absolutely dry, composite restorations may take up to 20 minutes longer than equivalent amalgam restorations. Longer time in the dental chair may test the patience of children, making the procedure more difficult for the dentist. Due to the longer time involved, the fee charged by a dentist for a composite restoration may be higher than for an amalgam restoration.
- Costs: Composite restoration cases generally have limited insurance coverage. Some dental insurance plans may provide reimbursement for composite restoration only on front teeth where amalgam restorations would be particularly objectionable on cosmetic grounds. Thus, patients may be required to pay the entire charge for composite restorations on posterior teeth. For example one dental insurer states that most of their plans will pay for resin (i.e. composite) fillings only "on the teeth where their cosmetic benefit is critical: the six front teeth (incisors and cuspids) and on the facial (cheek side) surfaces of the next two teeth (bicuspids)." Even if charges are paid by private insurance or government programs, the higher cost is incorporated in dental insurance premiums or tax rates. In the UK, dental composites are not covered by NHS for the restoration of posterior teeth. Patients, therefore, may require to pay the entire charge of the treatment or have to pay according to the private charge rate.

== Direct dental composites ==
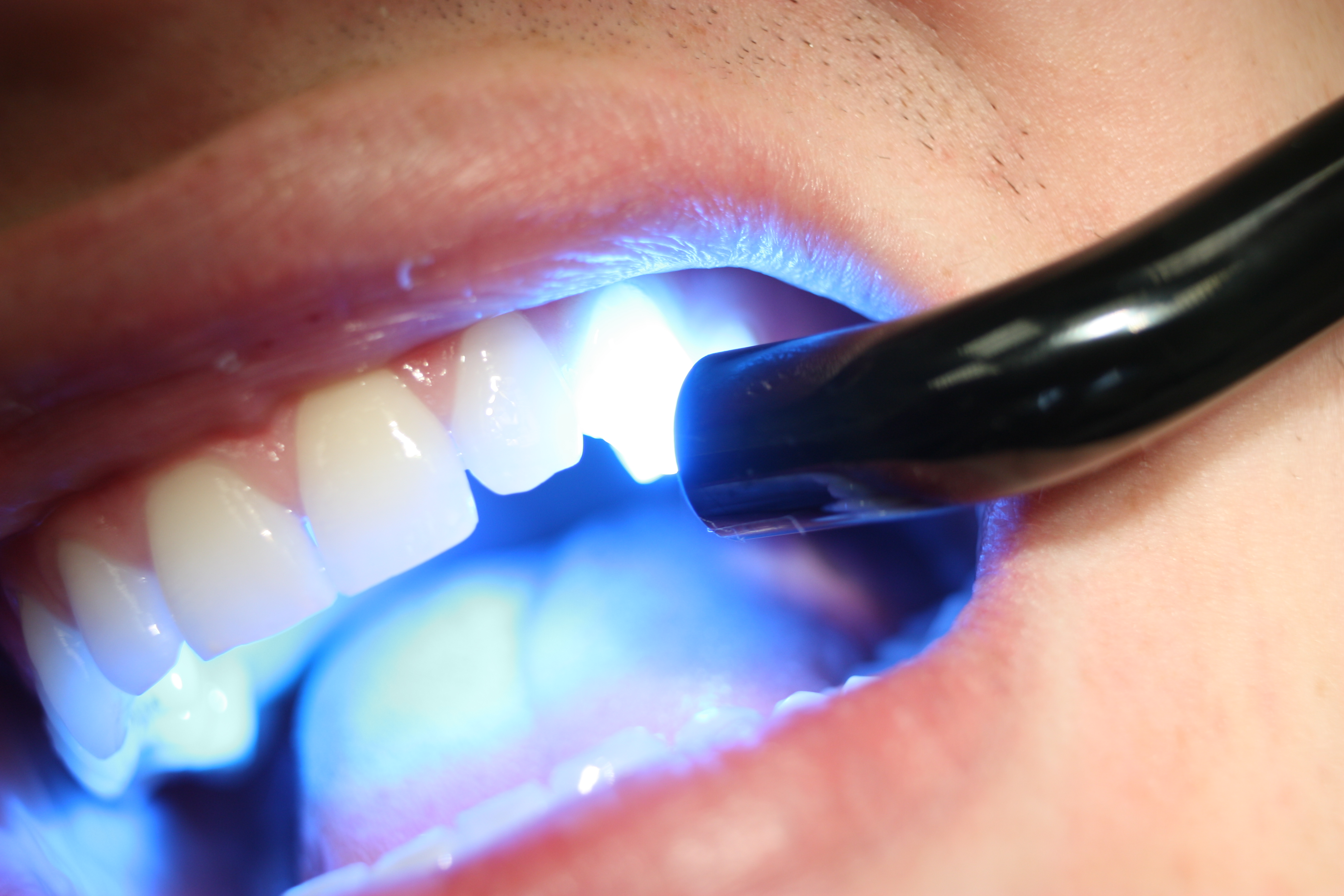
A hand-held wand that emits primary blue light (λmax=450-470nm) is used to cure the resin within a dental patient's mouth.

Direct dental composites are placed by the dentist in a clinical setting. Polymerization is accomplished typically with a hand held curing light that emits specific wavelengths keyed to the initiator and catalyst packages involved. When using a curing light, the light should be held as close to the resin surface as possible, a shield should be placed between the light tip and the operator's eyes. Curing time should be increased for darker resin shades. Light cured resins provide denser restoration than self-cured resins because no mixing is required that might introduce air bubble porosity.

Direct dental composites can be used for:

- Filling cavity preparations
- Filling gaps (diastemas) between teeth using a shell-like veneer or
- Minor reshaping of teeth
- Partial crowns on single teeth

=== Setting mechanisms of resin composite ===
Types of setting mechanisms:

- Chemical cure (self-cure / dark cure)
- Light cure
- Dual cure (setting both chemically and by light)

Chemically cured resin composite is a two-paste system (base and catalyst) which starts to set when the base and the catalyst are mixed together.

Light cured resin composites contains a photo-initiator (e.g. camphorquinone) and an accelerator. The activator present in light activated composite is diethyl-amino-ethyl-methacrylate (amine) or diketone. They interact when exposed to light at wavelength of 400-500 nm, i.e., blue region of the visible light spectrum. The composite sets when it is exposed to light energy at a set wavelength of light. Light cured resin composites are also sensitive to ambient light, and therefore, polymerisation can begin before use of the curing light.

Dual cured resin composite contains both photo-initiators and chemical accelerators, allowing the material to set even where there is insufficient light exposure for light curing.

Chemical polymerisation inhibitors (e.g. monomethyl ether of hydroquinone) are added to the resin composite to prevent polymerisation of the material during storage, increasing its shelf life.

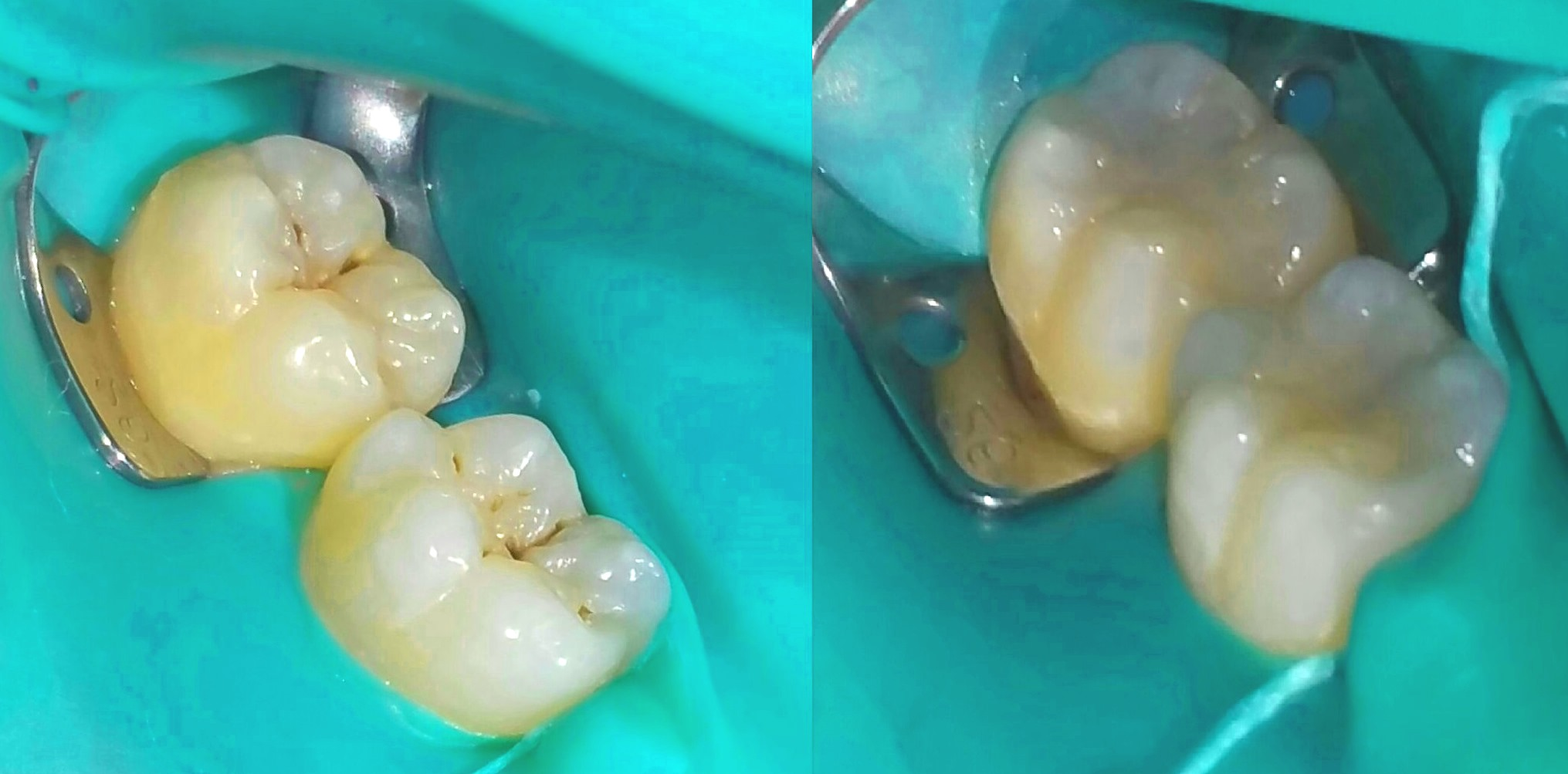
The use of flowable composite in early decay of lower molar teeth.

=== Classification of resin composites according to handling characteristics ===
This classification divides resin composite into three broad categories based on their handling characteristics:

- Universal: advocated for general use, oldest subtype of resin composite
- Flowable: fluid consistency, used for very small restorations
- Packable: stiffer, more viscous material used solely for posterior parts of the mouth

Manufacturers manipulate the handling characteristics by altering the constituents of the material. Generally, the stiffer materials (packable) exhibit a higher filler content whilst fluid materials (flowable) exhibit lower filler loading. Universal: This is the traditional presentation of resin composites and performs well in many situations. However, their use is limited in specialised practice where more complex aesthetic treatments are undertaken. Indications include: the restoration of class I, II and III and IV where aesthetics is not paramount, and the repair of non-carious tooth surface loss (NCTSL) lesions. Contraindications include: restoration of ultraconservative cavities, in areas where aesthetics is critical, and where insufficient enamel is available for etching. Flowable: Flowable composites represent a relatively newer subset of resin-based composite material, dating back to the mid-1990s. Compared to universal composite, flowables have a reduced filler content (37–53%) thereby exhibiting ease of handling, lower viscosity, compressive strength, wear resistance and greater polymerisation shrinkage. Due to the poorer mechanical properties, flowable composites should be used with caution in high stress-bearing areas. However, due to its favourable wetting properties, it can adapt intimately to enamel and dentine surfaces. Indications include: restoration of small class I cavities, preventive resin restorations (PRR), fissure sealants, cavity liners, repair of deficient amalgam margins, and class V (abfraction) lesions caused by NCTSL. Contraindications include: in high stress-bearing areas, restoration of large multi-surface cavities, and if effective moisture control is unattainable.

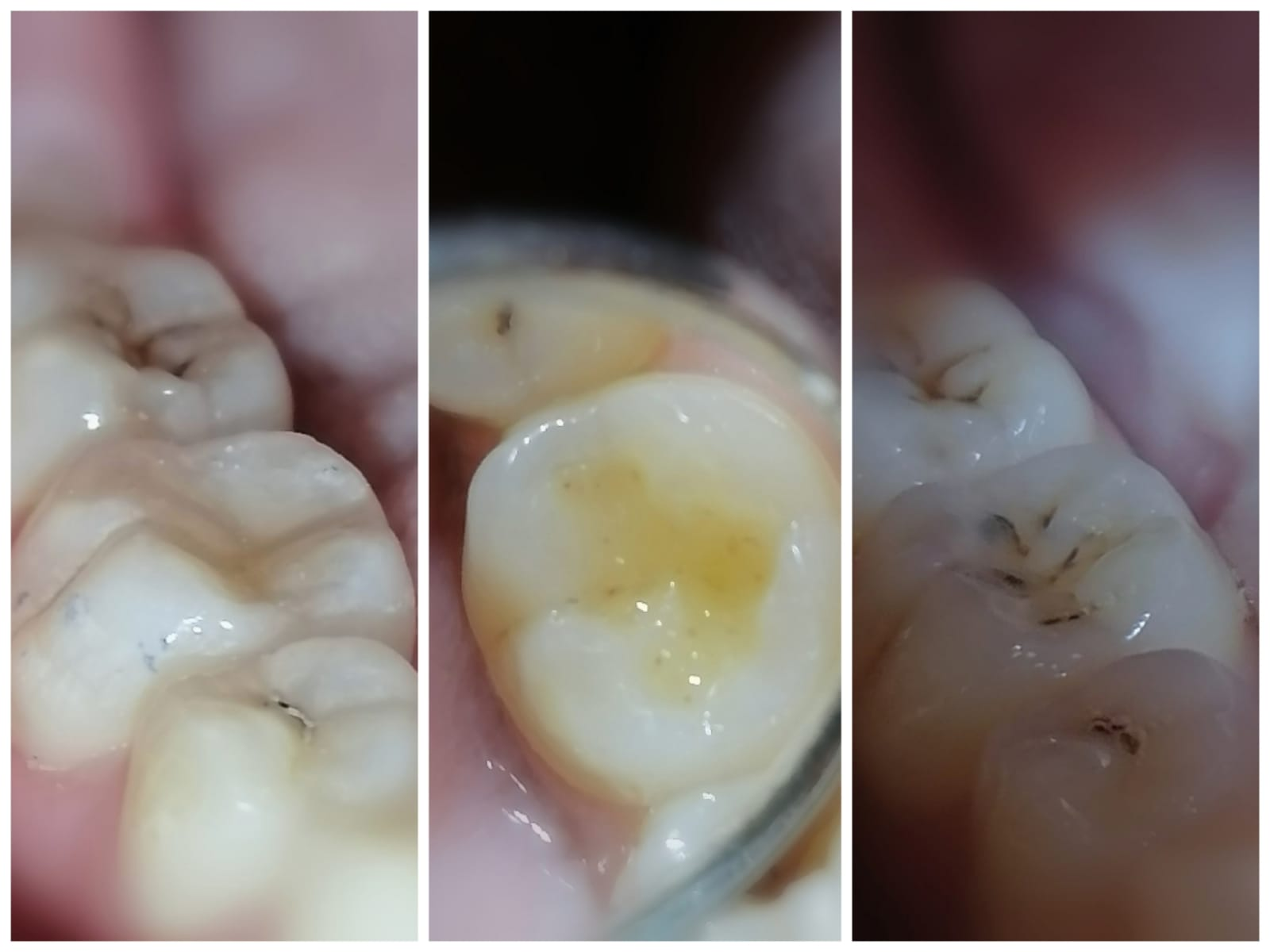
Packable composite placed in a lower right 6 (Simple class 1), Notice the occlusal anatomy mimicking the natural tooth

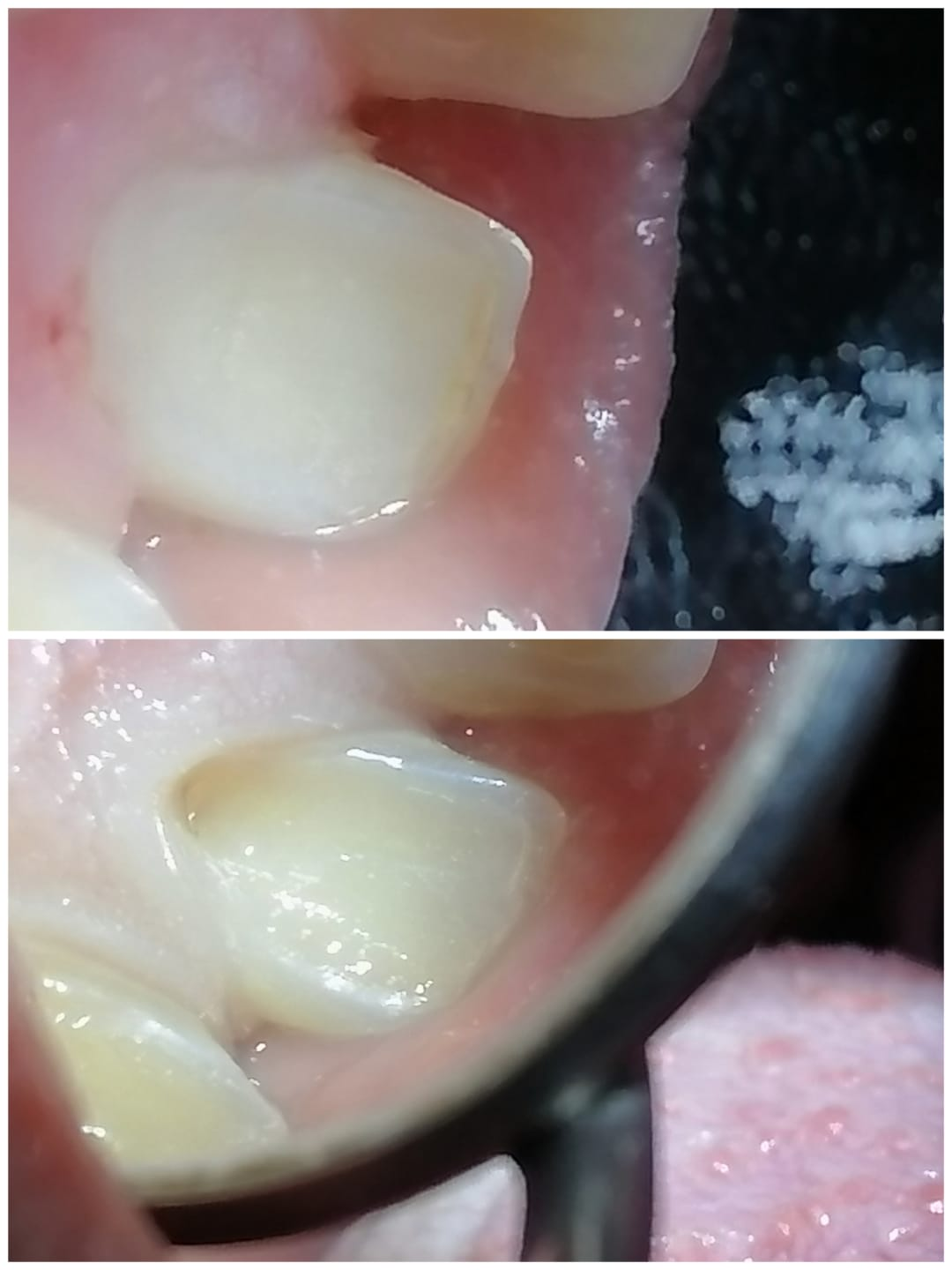
Packable composite placed in an upper right 2 ( Class 1 palatal pit)

Packable: Packable composites were developed to be used in posterior situations. Unlike flowable composite, they exhibit a higher viscosity thereby necessitating greater force upon application to 'pack' the material into the prepared cavity. Their handling characteristics is more similar to dental amalgam, in that greater force is required to condense the material into the cavity. Therefore, they can be thought of as 'tooth-coloured amalgam'. The increased viscosity is achieved by a higher filler content (>60% by volume) – thereby making the material stiffer and more resistant to fracture, two properties that are ideal for materials to be used in the posterior region of the mouth. The disadvantage of the associated increased filler content is the potential risk of introducing voids along the cavity walls and between each layer of material. In order to seal any marginal deficiencies, the use of a single layer of flowable composite at the base of a cavity has been advocated when undertaking Class II posterior composite restorations when using packable composite.

== Indirect dental composites ==
Indirect composite is cured outside the mouth, in a processing unit that is capable of delivering higher intensities and levels of energy than handheld lights can. Indirect composites can have higher filler levels, are cured for longer times and curing shrinkage can be handled in a better way. As a result, they are less prone to shrinkage stress and marginal gaps and have higher levels and depths of cure than direct composites. For example, an entire crown can be cured in a single process cycle in an extra-oral curing unit, compared to a millimeter layer of a filling.

As a result, full crowns and even bridges (replacing multiple teeth) can be fabricated with these systems.

Indirect dental composites can be used for:

- Filling cavities in teeth, as fillings, inlays and/or onlays
- Filling gaps (diastemas) between teeth using a shell-like veneer or
- Reshaping of teeth
- Full or partial crowns on single teeth
- Bridges spanning 2-3 teeth

A stronger, tougher and more durable product is expected in principle. But in the case of inlays, not all clinical long-term-studies detect this advantage in clinical practice (see below).

== Longevity and clinical performance ==
=== Direct composite vs amalgam ===
Clinical survival of composite restorations placed in posterior teeth are in the range of amalgam restorations, with some studies seeing a slightly lower or slightly higher survival time compared to amalgam restorations. Improvements in composite technology and application technique make composites a very good alternative to amalgam, while use in large restorations and in cusp capping situations is still debated.

According to a 2012 review article by Demarco et al. covering 34 relevant clinical studies, "90% of the studies indicated that annual failure rates between 1% and 3% can be achieved with Class I and II posterior [rear tooth] composite restorations depending on the definition of failure, and on several factors such as tooth type and location, operator [dentist], and socioeconomic, demographic, and behavioral elements." This compares to a 3% mean annual failure rate reported in a 2004 review article by Manhart et al. for amalgam restorations in posterior stress-bearing cavities.

The Demarco review found that the main reasons cited for failure of posterior composite restorations are secondary caries (i.e. cavities which develop subsequent to the restoration), fracture, and patient behavior, notably bruxism (grinding/clenching.) Causes of failure for amalgam restorations reported in the Manhart et al.review also include secondary caries, fracture (of the amalgam and/or the tooth), as well as cervical overhang and marginal ditching. The Demarco et al. review of composite restoration studies noted that patient factors affect longevity of restorations: Compared to patients with generally good dental health, patients with poorer dental health (possibly due to poor dental hygiene, diet, genetics, frequency of dental checkups, etc.) experience higher rates of failure of composite restorations due to subsequent decay. Socioeconomic factors also play a role: "People who had always lived in the poorest stratus [sic][stratum?] of the population had more restoration failures than those who lived in the richest layer."

The definition of failure applied in clinical studies may affect the reported statistics. Demarco et al note: "Failed restorations or restorations presenting small defects are routinely treated by replacement by most clinicians. Because of this, for many years, the replacement of defective restorations has been reported as the most common treatment in general dental practice..." Demarco et al observe that when both repaired and replaced restorations were classified as failures in one study, the Annual Failure Rate was 1.9%. However, when repaired restorations were reclassified as successes instead of failures, the AFR decreased to 0.7%. Reclassifying repairable minor defects as successes rather than failures is justifiable: "When a restoration is replaced, a significant amount of sound tooth structure is removed and the preparation [i.e. hole] is enlarged". Applying the narrower definition of failure would improve the reported longevity of composite restorations: Composite restorations can often be easily repaired or extended without drilling out and replacing the entire filling. Resin composites will adhere to the tooth and to undamaged prior composite material. In contrast, amalgam fillings are held in place by the shape of the void being filled rather than by adhesion. This means that it is often necessary to drill out and replace an entire amalgam restoration rather than add to the remaining amalgam.

=== Direct vs indirect composites ===
It might be expected that the costlier indirect technique leads to a higher clinical performance, however this is not seen in all studies. A study conducted over the course of 11 years reports similar failure rates of direct composite fillings and indirect composite inlays. Another study concludes that although there is a lower failure rate of composite inlays it would be insignificant and anyway too small to justify the additional effort of the indirect technique. Also in the case of ceramic inlays a significantly higher survival rate compared to composite direct fillings can not be detected.

In general, a clear superiority of tooth coloured inlays over composite direct fillings could not be established by the review literature (as of 2013).

== See also ==
- Dental bonding
- Dental sealants
