= 6-oxocamphor hydrolase =

Class of enzymes

Identifiers
- EC no.: 3.7.1.18

Databases
- BRENDA: enzyme data
- ExPASy: NiceZyme view
- KEGG: enzyme entry
- MetaCyc: metabolic pathway
- Rhea: reactions
- PDB structures: RCSB PDB PDBe PDBsum
Search
- PMC: articles
- PubMed: articles
- NCBI: proteins

6-oxocamphor hydrolase (EC 3.7.1.18, OCH, camK (gene)) is an enzyme characterised from Rhodococcus species with systematic name bornane-2,6-dione hydrolase. It catalyses the hydrolysis and cleavage of 1,3-diketones in a reaction which is the reverse of a Claisen condensation.

The enzyme is named after one specific reaction, the conversion of bornane-2,6-dione to a single chiral isomer, (1R,3S)-2,2,3-trimethyl-4-oxocyclopentyl)acetic acid:

bornane-2,6-dione
H_{2}O
((1R,3S)-2,2,3-trimethyl-4-oxocyclopentyl)acetic acid

This is an example of a desymmetrization reaction, since the starting material is of meso form and hence achiral. The enzyme is a member of the crotonase family of proteins. This type of reaction has been found to be useful in the synthesis of optically pure keto acids.
