= Desymmetrization =

Molecular change in chemistry

Desymmetrization is a chemical reaction that converts prochiral substrates into chiral products. Desymmetrisations are so pervasive that they are rarely described as such except when they proceed enantioselectively. The enantioselective reactions require chiral catalysts or chiral reagents. According to IUPAC, desymmetrization involves the "... the conversion of a prochiral molecular entity into a chiral one."

== Examples ==
Typical substrates are epoxides, diols, dienes, and cyclic carboxylic acid anhydrides.

One example is the conversion of cis-3,5-diacetoxycyclopentene to monoacetate. This particular conversion utilizes the enzyme cholinesterase.

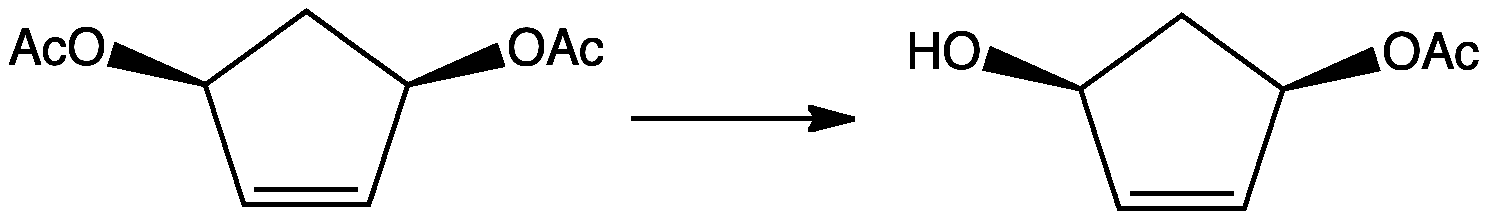

In another example, a symmetrical cyclic imide is subjected to asymmetric deprotonation resulting in a chiral product with high enantioselectivity.

Partial hydrogenation converts benzil (PhC(O)C(O)Ph) into chiral hydrobenzoin. The process can be implemented enantioselectively using transfer hydrogenation.

PhC(O)C(O)Ph + H_{2} → PhCH(OH)C(O)Ph (Ph = C_{6}H_{5})

The precursor benzil has C_{2v} symmetry, and the product is C_{2} symmetric.

Citric acid is also a symmetric molecule that can be desymmetrized by partial methylation.

Desymmetrization of citric acid

The alcoholysis of cyclic anhydrides can be conducted enantiosymmetrically using chiral amine catalysts.

A related example is the hydrolysis of prochiral diesters catalyzed by chiral phosphoric acids.

== Formal symmetry considerations ==
Desymmetrizations involve the loss of an improper axis of rotation (mirror plane, center of inversion, rotation-reflection axis). In other words, desymmetrisations convert prochiral precursors into chiral products.
