= Amalgam (dentistry) =

Material used in dentistry for direct restorative procedures in the tooth

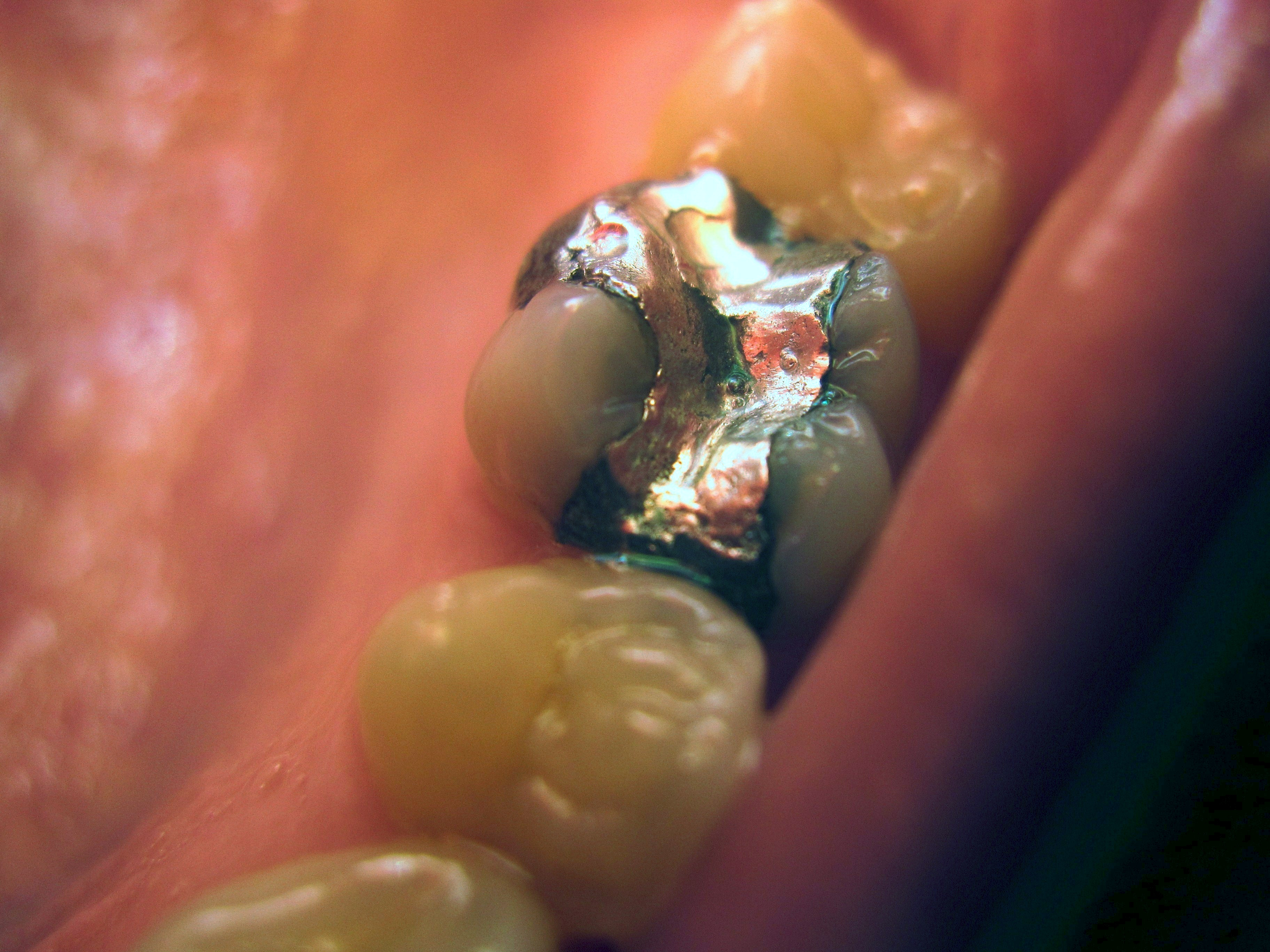
Amalgam filling on first molar

In dentistry, amalgam is an alloy of mercury used to fill teeth cavities. It is made by mixing a combination of liquid mercury and particles of solid metals such as silver, copper or tin. The amalgam is mixed by the dentist just before use. It remains soft for a short while after mixing, which facilitates it being snugly packed into the cavity and shaped before it sets hard.

Dental amalgams were first documented in a Tang dynasty medical text written by Su Gong (苏恭) in 659, and appeared in Germany in 1528. In the 1800s, amalgam became the dental restorative material of choice due to its low cost, ease of application, strength, and durability.

== History of use ==
There are, according to Geir Bjørklund, indications that dental amalgam was used in the first part of the Tang dynasty in China (AD 618–907), and in Germany by Strockerus in about 1528. Evidence of a dental amalgam first appears in the Tang dynasty medical text Xinxiu bencao (新修本草) written by Su Gong (苏恭) in 659, manufactured from tin and silver. Historical records hint that the use of amalgams may date to even earlier in the Tang dynasty. It was during the Ming dynasty that the composition of an early dental amalgam was first published, and a text written by Liu Wentai in 1505 states that it consists of "100 shares of mercury, 45 shares of silver and 900 shares of tin."

Ever since its introduction in the Western world from 1818 and into the 1830s, amalgam has been the subject of recurrent controversies because of its mercury content. Early amalgam was made by mixing mercury with the filings of silver coins. In 1833, Polish dentists from London, Edward Crawcour and his nephew Moses Crawcour (incorrectly referred to as "the Crawcour Brothers"), brought amalgam to the United States; but they had to flee back to Europe one year later, leaving "a long trail of victimized patients and exasperated dentists" due to their malpractices.

However, the use of amalgam caught on in the following years, and in 1844 it was reported that fifty percent of all dental restorations placed in upstate New York consisted of amalgam. The same year, the use of dental amalgam was declared to be malpractice by the American Society of Dental Surgeons (ASDS), the only US dental association at the time, who forced all of its members to sign a pledge to abstain from using the mercury fillings. This was the beginning of what is known as the first dental amalgam war. The dispute ended in 1856 with the disbanding of the old association. The American Dental Association (ADA) was founded in its place in 1859, which has since then strongly defended dental amalgam from allegations of being too risky from the health standpoint.

The controversy about amalgam fillings continued throughout the rest of the nineteenth century, with regional dentist societies condemning them, such as the St. Louis Odontological Society did as early as 1867.

=== Low copper to high copper amalgam alloy ===
Amalgam has been used for many years for restorations, commonly known as fillings. Prior to 1900 many compositions were tried but few were successful when placed in the oral environment. Around 1900, small amounts of copper and occasionally zinc were added. Zinc acts as a scavenger because it prevents oxidation of the other metals in the alloy during the manufacturing process. Zinc accomplishes this by combining readily with oxygen to form zinc oxide. Amalgam restorations made from this balanced formula were reasonably successful and its longevity increased. However, one disadvantage that remained was fracture at the tooth-amalgam interface commonly called marginal fracture. Sn_{8}Hg (γ_{2} phase) was considered to be responsible for this problem. This phase has been shown to be the weakest phase in the set amalgam and is subject to corrosion, particularly at the tooth-amalgam interface.

In 1962 a new amalgam alloy, called Dispersalloy, was introduced by William and Ralph Youdelis of Edmonton, Alberta, Canada. William was a metallurgist in the Faculty of Engineering at the University of Alberta. His younger brother Ralph was a 1955 graduate of the Faculty of Dentistry at the same university. William Youdelis added a spherical silver-copper eutectic particle to the traditional lathe-cut Ag_{3}Sn particle in a ratio of 1:2. The mixture of these two types of particles is known as admix alloy. This alloy strengthened the set amalgam and reduced the γ_{2} phase (Sn_{8}Hg). The increased copper in the silver-copper eutectic reacted preferentially with tin so that Sn_{8}Hg could not form. Early results from the clinical use of this new amalgam showed an improvement in marginal integrity. Faculty members of the Department of Operative Dentistry at The University of Alberta Faculty of Dentistry conducted clinical trials on the new material. It was produced by a local Edmonton company, Western Metallurgical. Johnson & Johnson pharmaceuticals eventually purchased the patent from the Youdelis brothers. 10 years later, another alloy, called Tytin, was introduced by adding significant amount of Cu_{3}Sn together with Ag_{3}Sn, in the form of a unicompositional spherical particle to eliminate the γ_{2} phase. Both of these relatively new alloys raised the copper content from 5%, present in the older balanced composition alloy, to about 13% for the newer alloys.

== Composition ==
Dental amalgam is produced by mixing liquid mercury with an alloy made of silver, tin, and copper solid particles. Small quantities of zinc, mercury and other metals may be present in some alloys. This combination of solid particles is known as amalgam alloy. The composition of the alloy particles are controlled by the ISO Standard (ISO 1559) for dental amalgam alloy in order to control properties of set amalgam such as corrosion and setting expansion. It is important to differentiate between dental amalgam and the amalgam alloy that is commercially produced and marketed as small filings, spheroid particles, or a combination of these, suitable for mixing with liquid mercury to produce the dental amalgam. Amalgam is used most commonly for direct, permanent, posterior restorations and for large foundation restorations, or cores, which are precursors to placing crowns.

The reaction between mercury and alloy when mixed together is termed an amalgamation reaction. It will result in the formation of a silver-grey workable mass which can be condensed into cavities. After condensing, the dental amalgam is shaped to generate the required anatomical features and then hardens with time. The standard composition of alloy prior to 1986 is referred to as conventional amalgam alloy. More recently (post-1986), there has been a change in the compositional standard of the alloy due to better understanding of structure-property relationships for the materials. Conventional amalgam alloy commonly consists of silver (~65%), tin (~29%), copper (~8%) and other trace metals; current amalgam alloy consists of silver (40%), tin (32%), copper (30%) and other metals.

Alloy powder is then mixed with liquid mercury to produce dental amalgam. Low-copper amalgam commonly consists of mercury (50%), silver (~22–32%), tin (~14%), zinc (~8%) and other trace metals.

== Metallurgy ==
To fabricate an amalgam filling, the dentist uses a mixing device to blend roughly equal parts (by mass) of shavings of a silver-base alloy with mercury until the shavings are thoroughly wetted. The silver alloy is typically 40–70% Ag, 25-29% Sn, 2–40% Cu and 0–2% Zn (when the alloy is formulated Zn is a scavenger and is mostly consumed during melting and lost as oxide). The dentist packs the plastic mass, before it sets, into the cavity. The amalgam expands ≈0.1% over 6–8 hours on setting.

The final structure is a metal matrix composite, where γ_{1}, η and γ_{2} phases, are a matrix for unreacted original alloy, minus the fast-reacting β-phase and excess Sn.

== Properties ==
Amalgam is a mixture of two or more metals (alloy) with mercury which has been purified first by distillation to remove impurities. Major components of the alloy are silver, tin, and copper. The composition of the alloy powder is controlled by ISO standard for dental amalgam alloy (ISO 1559) to control the properties of amalgam.

=== Plastic deformation (creep) ===
Creep or plastic deformation happens when subjected to intra-oral stresses such as chewing or grinding. Creep causes the amalgam to flow and protrudes from the margin of the cavity forming unsupported edges. "Ditch" is formed around the margins of the amalgam restoration after fracture due to amalgam creep at the occlusal margins. The γ2 phase of amalgam is primarily responsible for high values of creep.

=== Corrosion ===
Corrosion occurs when an anode and cathode are set up in the presence of electrolytes, creating an electrolytic cell. The multiphase structure of dental amalgam can contribute as an anode or cathode with saliva as electrolytes. Corrosion may significantly affect the structure and mechanical properties of set dental amalgam. In conventional amalgam, γ2 phase is the most reactive and readily forms an anode. It will break down releasing corrosion products and mercury. Some of the mercury will combine rapidly with unreacted alloy and some will be ingested. The chances of ditching are further increased. Copper-enriched amalgams contain little or no γ2 phase. The copper–tin phase, which replaces γ2 in these materials, is still the most corrosion-prone phase in the amalgam. The corrosion however is still much lower than conventional amalgam.

In spite of that, it is thought that corrosion actually offers a clinical advantage. The corrosion products will gather at the tooth-amalgam interface and fill the microgap (marginal gap) which helps to decrease microleakage. Even so, there are no reports of increased marginal leakage for the copper-enriched amalgams indicating that sufficient quantities of corrosion product are produced to seal the margins.

Microleakage is the leakage of minute amounts of fluids, debris, and microorganisms through the microscopic space between a dental restoration and the adjacent surface of the cavity preparation. Microleakage can risk recurrent cavities.

=== Strength ===
An amalgam restoration develops its strength slowly and may take up to 24 hours or longer to reach a reasonably high value. At the time when the patient is dismissed from the surgery, typically some 15–20 minutes after placing the filling, the amalgam is relatively weak. Therefore, dentists need to instruct patients not to apply undue stress to their freshly placed amalgam fillings.

In addition, amalgam restorations are brittle and susceptible to corrosion.

== Reaction phases ==
γ : Ag_{3}Sn (mechanically the strongest)
γ_{1} : Ag_{2}Hg_{3} (major matrix phase in set amalgam)
γ_{2} : Sn_{8}Hg (weakest phase, corrodes easily)
β : Ag_{5}Sn
η' : Cu_{6}Sn_{5}
ε : Cu_{3}Sn

The alloys are broadly classified as low-copper (5% or less copper) and high-copper alloys (13% to 30% copper). The solid particles of the alloy are either spherical or irregularly shaped microspheres of various sizes or a combination of the two. The low-copper alloys have either irregular or spherical particles. High-copper alloys contain either spherical particles of the same composition (unicompositional) or a mixture of irregular and spherical particles of different or the same composition (admixed). The properties of set amalgam depends upon the alloy composition—particle size, shape and distribution—and heat treatment controls the characteristic properties of the amalgam.

=== Low copper alloy ===
During trituration, mercury diffuses into the silver-tin particles. Then, silver and tin dissolve, to a very limited extent, into the mercury. As this occurs, the particles become smaller. Because the solubility of both silver and tin in mercury is limited and because silver is much less soluble in mercury than is tin, silver precipitates out first as silver-mercury (γ_{1}) followed by tin in the form of tin-mercury (γ_{2}). The set amalgam consists of unreacted gamma particles surrounded by a matrix of gamma 1 and gamma 2. The amalgamation is summarised as follows:

Ag_{3}Sn, Ag_{5}Sn + Hg → Ag_{2}Hg_{3} + Sn_{8}Hg + Ag_{3}Sn

i.e. (γ + β) + Hg → γ_{1} + γ_{2 +} γ

=== High copper alloy ===
In high copper alloy, copper is added to improve mechanical properties, resistance to corrosion and marginal integrity. The higher copper is supplied by either the silver-copper eutectic or the Cu_{3}Sn (ε) phase. The fact that tin had a greater affinity for copper than for mercury meant that the gamma-2 phase was reduced or eliminated. This resulted in the dramatic improvement in physical properties. The higher copper content is supplied as two types:

1. High copper admix alloy (spherical particles of the silver-copper eutectic alloy to a low-copper lathe-cut alloy in a ratio of 1:2)
2. Uni/single-composition alloy

==== Admix alloy setting reaction ====
During trituration, the dissolved silver from the silver-tin particles reacts, as in low copper alloys, to form the γ1 phase. The dissolved tin migrates to the outside of the silver-copper particles to form Cu_{6}Sn_{5}, the eta prime (η′) phase of the copper-tin system. Thus, copper reacts with sufficient tin to prevent the formation of γ2. The amalgamation reaction may be simplified as follows (notice the absence of γ_{2} phase):

γ(Ag_{3}Sn) + Ag-Cu (eutectic) + Hg → γ1 (Ag_{2}Hg_{3})+ η ′ (Cu_{6}Sn_{5})+ unreacted γ (Ag_{3}Sn) + unreacted Ag-Cu (eutectic)

==== Uni/single composition alloy ====
Here, the alloy particles contain both Ag_{3}Sn(γ) and Cu_{3}Sn(ε), similar to the low-copper lathe-cut alloys, but with much greater amount of the Cu_{3}Sn(ε) phase. These alloys are usually spherical. When liquid mercury is mixed with these alloys, it diffuses into the surface of these particles forming Ag_{2}Hg_{3} as well as Cu_{6}Sn_{5}_{.}

γ(Ag_{3}Sn) + ɛ(Cu_{3}Sn) + Hg → γ1 (Ag_{2}Hg_{3}) + η ′ (Cu_{6}Sn_{5}) + unreacted [γ (Ag_{3}Sn)+ ɛ (Cu_{3}Sn )]

The difference in eta prime phase of admixed alloy and unicomposition alloy is that in unicomposition alloy, Cu_{6}Sn_{5} crystals are much larger and rod-shaped than those in admixed alloy. Copper added in unicomposition causes removal of the gamma2 phase.

=== Advantages of high copper compared to low copper alloy ===
1. Better corrosion resistance.
2. Less susceptible to creep.
3. Greater strength.
4. Less tarnish and corrosion.
5. Greater longevity.

== Amalgam vs. polymer resins ==
Amalgam is tolerant to a wide range of clinical placement conditions and moderately tolerant to the presence of moisture during placement. In contrast, the techniques for composite resin placement are more sensitive to many factors.

Mercury has properties of a bacteriostatic agent whereas certain methacrylate polymers (for example TEGMA, triethylene glycol methacrylate) composing the matrix of resin composites "encourages the growth of microorganisms". In the Casa Pia study in Portugal (1986–1989), 1,748 posterior restorations were placed and 177 (10.1%) of them failed during the course of the study. Recurrent marginal decay was the main reason for failure in both amalgam and composite restorations, accounting for 66% (32/48) and 88% (113/129), respectively. Polymerization shrinkage, the shrinkage that occurs during the composite curing process, has been implicated in a 2002 review of the literature and a 2003 study as the primary reason for postoperative marginal leakage.

However, there is low-quality evidence in two studies to suggest that resin composites lead to higher failure rates and risk of secondary caries than amalgam restorations.

Several reviews have been made by using database in the Cochrane Library where randomized controlled trials of few studies comparing dental resin composite with dental amalgams in permanent posterior teeth were compared. This review supports the fact that amalgam restorations are particularly useful and successful in parts of the world where amalgam is still the material of choice to restore posterior teeth with proximal caries. Though, there is insufficient evidence to support or refute any adverse effects amalgam may have on patients, new research is unlikely to change opinion on its safety and due to the decision for a global phase-down of amalgam (Minamata Convention on Mercury) general opinion on its safety is unlikely to change.

These are some of the reasons why amalgam has remained a superior restorative material over resin-base composites. The New England Children's Amalgam Trial (NECAT), a randomized controlled trial, yielded results "consistent with previous reports suggesting that the longevity of amalgam is higher than that of resin-based compomer in primary teeth, according to a 2007 review of the study, with some similar claims in a 2003 paper, and composites in permanent teeth according to that 2007 review and a paper from 1986. Compomers were seven times as likely to require replacement and composites were seven times as likely to require repair. There are circumstances in which composite serves better than amalgam. For example, when a more conservative preparation would be beneficial, composite is the recommended restorative material. These situations would include small occlusal restorations, in which amalgam would require the removal of more sound tooth structure, as well as in "enamel sites beyond the height of contour". For cosmetic purposes, composite is preferred when a restoration is required on an immediately visible portion of a tooth.

== Bonded amalgam ==
Dental amalgam does not by itself bond to tooth structure. This was recognized as a shortcoming by early practitioners such as Baldwin. He recommended that the prepared cavity be coated with zinc phosphate cement just prior to filling with amalgam, in order to improve the seal and retention. The practice did not become universally accepted and eventually fell into disuse. Until the 1980s, most amalgam restorations placed worldwide were done without adhesives, although in the 1970s a polycarboxylate-based adhesive liner was formulated specifically for this purpose In the mid-1980s the first reports of the use of resins to bond amalgam to etched tooth structure, much like is done for composite resins, appeared in the literature. Since then, a number of papers have been published on laboratory as well as clinical studies of the technique. For large cavity restorations, features such as pins, slots, holes and grooves can be used for the retention of large amalgam restorations, but they do not reinforce the amalgam or increase its strength.

There is no current scientific evidence to justify the extra cost and effort associated with the use of adhesively bonded amalgam restorations in comparison with nonbonded amalgam restorations. In view of the lack of evidence on the additional benefit of adhesively bonding amalgam compared with nonbonded amalgam, it is important that clinicians are mindful of the additional costs that may be incurred.

=== Liners and bases ===
The placement of amalgam restorations can potentially cause sensitivity post-operatively. According to R. Weiner, a protective layer or liner should be placed prior to the placement of amalgam to act as a buffer, helping to reduce sensitivity to the tooth. There are different liners that can be used in dental practices today, many of which contain zinc. Examples of lining materials include zinc oxide eugenol, zinc phosphate, glass ionomer cement, zinc poly-carboxylate and resin.

== Sealing amalgam restorations ==
A varnish can be applied to the cavity wall to provide a good marginal seal. The varnish should be insoluble in water and is usually composed of a resin in a volatile solvent. When applied to the cavity, the solvent evaporates, leaving the resin behind to seal the dentinal tubules. The amalgam can then be packed into the cavity.

== Dental amalgam toxicity ==
Concerns have been raised about the potential for mercury poisoning with dental amalgam when used in a dental filling. Major health and professional organizations regard amalgam as safe but questions have been raised and acute but rare allergic reactions have been reported.

Critics argue that it has toxic effects that make it unsafe, both for the patient and perhaps even more so for the dental professional manipulating it during a restoration. A study by the Life Sciences Research Office found that studies on mercury vapor and dental amalgam "provided insufficient information to enable definitive conclusions." They identified several "research gaps", including: "well-controlled studies using standardized measures that evaluate whether low level [mercury vapor exposures] produce neurotoxic and/or neuropsychological effect", studies on "co-exposure to Hg^{0} and methylmercury", studies on "in utero exposure to Hg^{0}" (elemental mercury), "occupational studies on [pregnant workers] with well-defined Hg^{0} exposure", studies on the absorption of Hg^{2+} by the "human neonatal gut from breast milk", studies on "whether dental professionals have increased incidences of kidney disease, emotional instability, erethism, pulmonary dysfunction, or other characteristics of occupational Hg^{0} exposure", studies on whether there exist "potential gender differences" or "genetic basis for sensitivity to mercury exposure." The removal of amalgam fillings is not recommended for reasons other than a true hypersensitivity to mercury. Mercury levels in blood and urine have been shown to rise for a short period of time following the removal of amalgam restorations and no studies have demonstrated any health gain from restoration removal. Removal involves exposure to mercury vapor released during the removal process. Amalgams also contribute to mercury toxicity in the environment. With regard to amalgam placement and removal in pregnancy, research has not shown any adverse effects for the mother or fetus. However, research is inadequate to determine the chance of harm occurring and therefore placement and removal should be avoided during pregnancy if possible.

In response to The Minamata Convention on Mercury, the European Commission has confirmed its position that individual nations should work to gradually scale down the use of dental amalgam.

In July 2018 the EU, "in consideration of the persistent pollution and environmental toxicity of amalgam's mercury", prohibited amalgam for dental treatment of children under 15 years and of pregnant or breastfeeding women.

== Environmental impact and prevention of amalgam poisoning ==
Dental amalgam is thought to be relatively safe to be used as a restorative material as it is used in low doses. Amalgam vapour can be released through chewing but this is minimal. However, there is an increased release of mercury following the exposure of electromagnetic fields generated by MRI machines, although the small amount released is not thought to pose a risk to health. Some patients may develop allergic reactions to it. Resin composite, glass ionomer cements and ceramic or gold inlays can be used as alternatives to amalgam.

=== U.S. amalgam disposal regulation ===
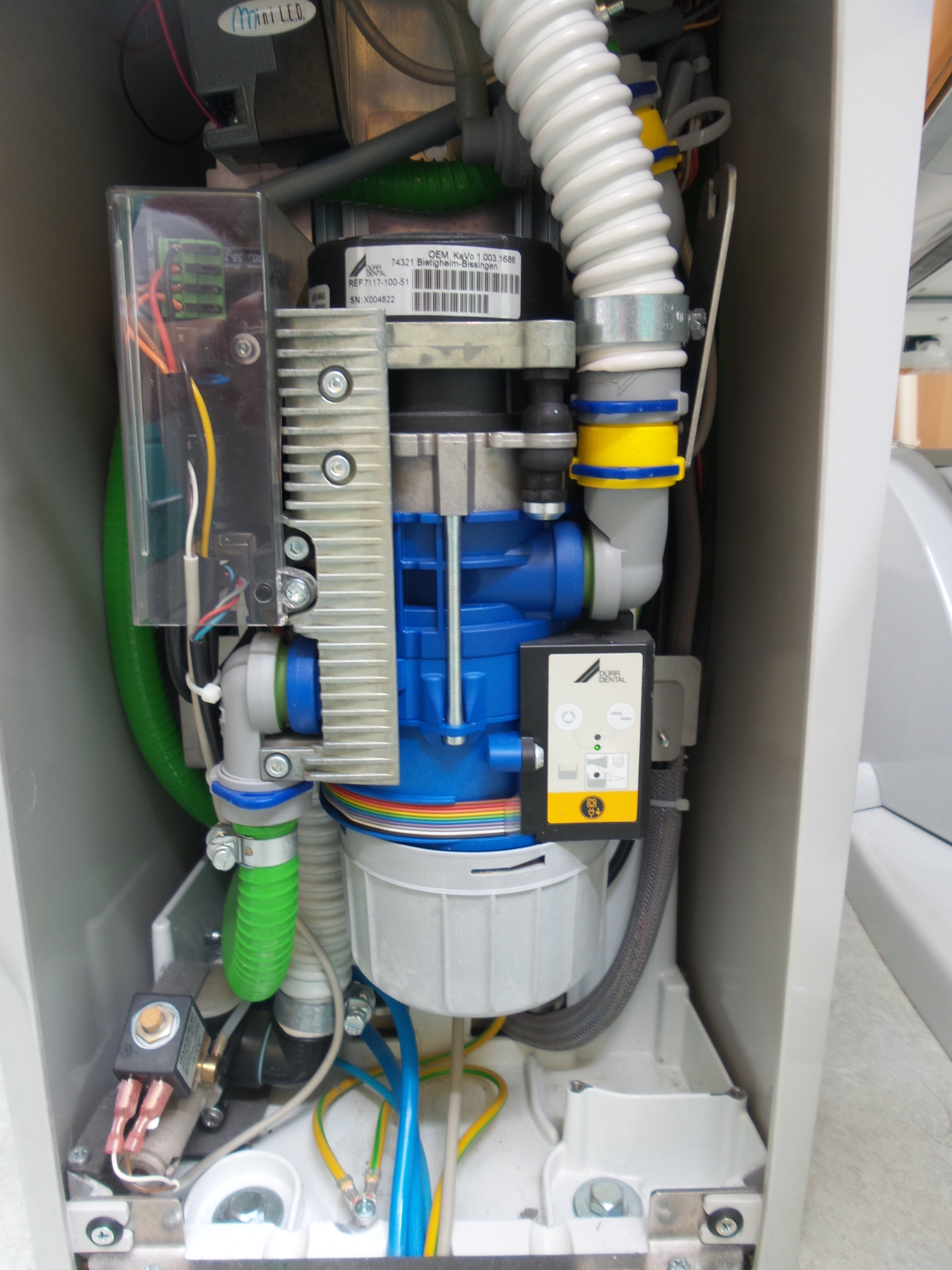
Amalgam separator

In the United States, dental offices have typically disposed of amalgam waste down the drain. The wastewater is sent to the local sewage treatment plant, which is not designed to treat or recycle mercury or other heavy metals. The mercury contaminates the sludge processed at the treatment plant, and thereby can spread the mercury in surrounding communities, if the sludge is land-applied for disposal. Dental amalgam is the largest source of mercury received by U.S. treatment plants.

The U.S. Environmental Protection Agency (EPA) promulgated an effluent guidelines regulation in 2017 which prohibits most dental practices from disposing dental amalgam waste down the drain. Most dental offices in the U.S. are required to use an amalgam separator in their drain system. The separator captures the waste material, which is then recycled.

=== EU amalgam disposal regulation ===
The European Commission has issued a Waste Directive that classifies amalgam waste as a hazardous waste. The waste should be separated from other waste by fitting amalgam separators in all dental practices.

=== Avoidance in pregnant women ===
Mercury can cross the placenta leading to stillbirths and birth defects. Although there is no evidence linking amalgam use and pregnancy damage, it is advisable to delay or avoid dealing with amalgam fillings in pregnant patients.

In July 2018 the EU prohibited amalgam for dental treatment of children under 15 years and of pregnant or breastfeeding women unless use of amalgam is medically indicated. There is no hint for a toxicity for the embryo of pregnant women. In addition, there is no scientific reason for avoiding amalgam for breastfeeding women. As the milk teeth won't remain for long, the avoidance of amalgam for children is driving by environmental considerations.

=== Awareness among dentists ===
The dental operating team should deal with amalgam with proper use of personal protective equipment to protect themselves. A popular methodology for removal and replacement is the Safe Mercury Amalgam Removal Technique or S.M.A.R.T. protocol.

=== Oral lesions ===
Some individuals have a sensitivity to amalgam and may develop oral lesions in which case a change of filling type is recommended.

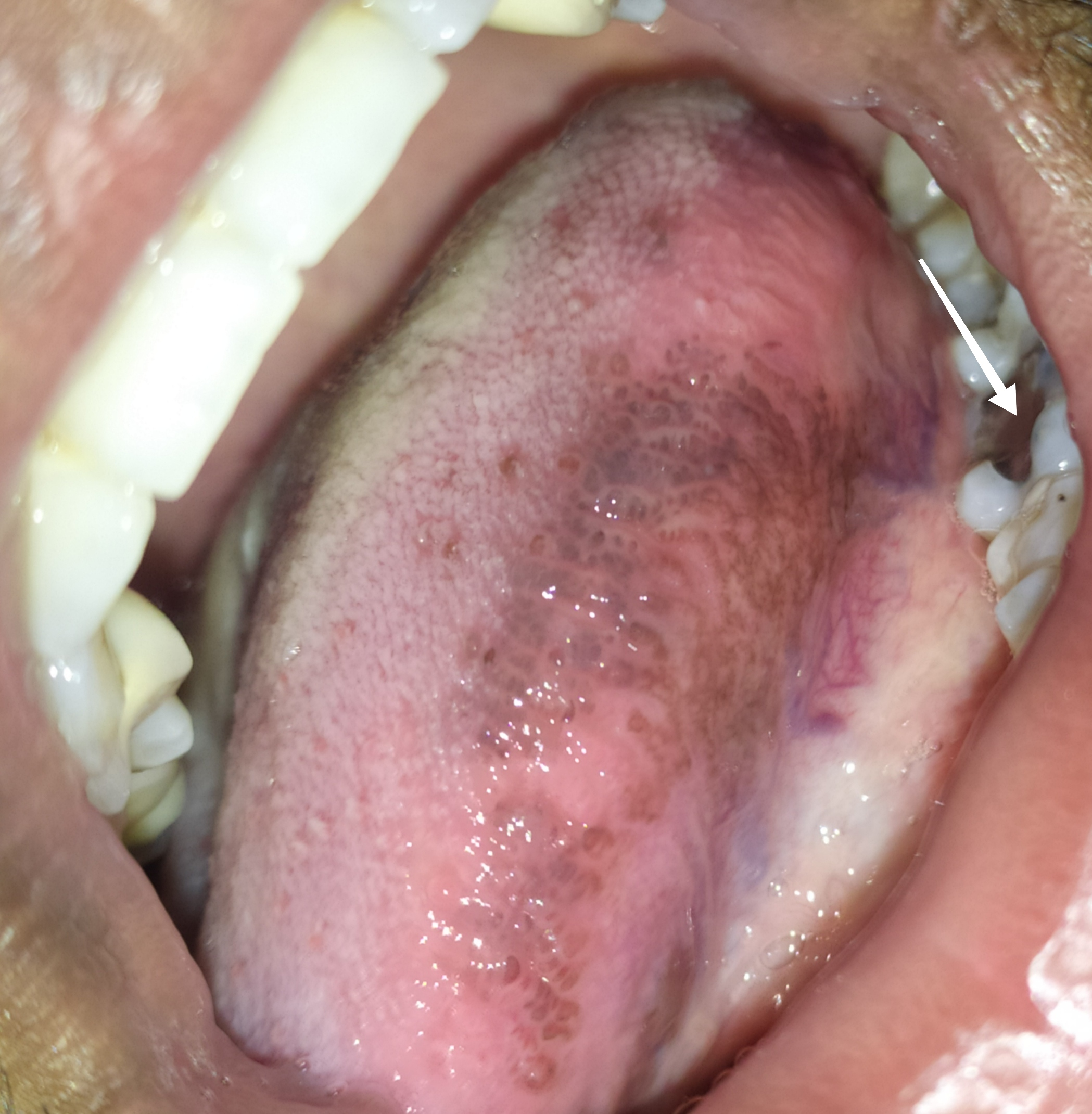
Amalgam induced lichen planus on the lateral surface of the tongue. Amalgam filling is indicated by white arrow
