= Camphorquinone =

Names
- IUPAC name 2,6-Bornanedione
- Other names Camphorquinone; 6-Oxocamphor; CQ; CPQ

Identifiers
CAS Number	10373-78-1
3D model (JSmol)	Interactive image
ChEBI	CHEBI:34607
ChEMBL	ChEMBL301431
ChemSpider	23544
ECHA InfoCard	100.030.728
EC Number	233-814-1
Gmelin Reference	482102
KEGG	C14515
PubChem CID	25208
UNII	RAL3591W33
CompTox Dashboard (EPA)	DTXSID7049394
- InChI: InChI=1S/C10H14O2/c1-9(2)6-4-5-10(9,3)8(12)7(6)11/h6H,4-5H2,1-3H3 Key: VNQXSTWCDUXYEZ-UHFFFAOYSA-N
- SMILES: CC1(C2CCC1(C(=O)C2=O)C)C

Properties
Chemical formula	C_{10}H_{14}O_{2}
Molar mass	166.220 g·mol^{−1}
Melting point	197–203 °C (387–397 °F; 470–476 K)

Hazards
- GHS labelling
Pictograms	(GHS07: Exclamation mark)
Signal word	Warning
Hazard statements	H315, H319, H335
Precautionary statements	P261, P264, P264+P265, P271, P280, P302+P352, P304+P340, P305+P351+P338, P319, P321, P332+P317, P337+P317, P362+P364, P403+P233, P405, P501
- Except where otherwise noted, data are given for materials in their standard state (at 25 °C [77 °F], 100 kPa). Infobox references

Camphorquinone, also known as 2,3-bornanedione, is an organic compound derived from camphor. A yellow solid, it is used as a photoinitiator in curing dental composites. Camphorquinone is produced by the Riley oxidation of camphor with selenium dioxide.

== Photocuring details ==
Polymerization is induced very slowly by camphorquinone, so amines such as N,N-dimethyl-p-toluidine, 2-ethyl-dimethylbenzoate, N-phenylglycine are generally added to increase the rate of curing.

It absorbs very weakly at 468 nm (extinction coefficient of 40 M^{−1}·cm^{−1}) giving it a pale yellow color. Photoexcitation results in nearly quantitative formation of its triplet state through intersystem crossing and very faint fluorescence.

== Reactions ==
It can be hydrolyzed by the enzyme 6-oxocamphor hydrolase.

Camphorquinone has been examined as a reagent in organic synthesis.
