= Photoinitiator =

Molecule which creates reactive species when exposed to radiation

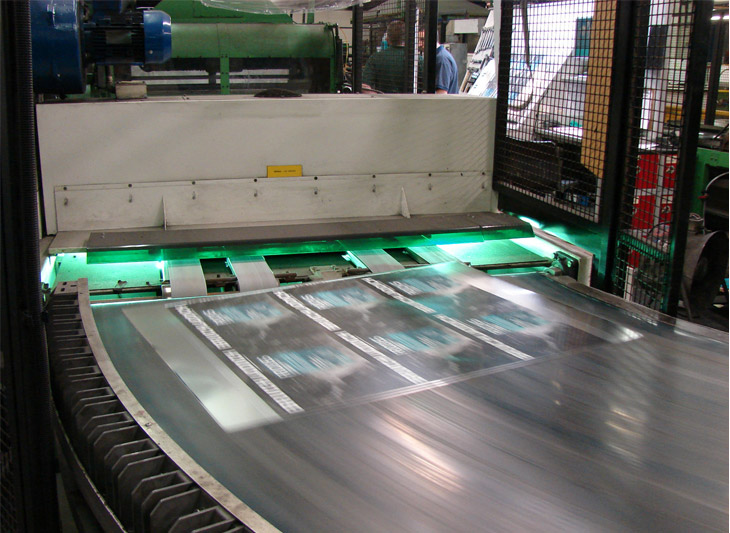
Large format sheets with a thin photopolymer coating cured with a UV lamp.

In chemistry, a photoinitiator is a molecule that creates reactive species (free radicals, cations or anions) when exposed to radiation (UV or visible). Photoinitiators are part of a photoinitating system alongside a sensitizer to produce reactive species that initiate the polymerization process. Photopolymerization involves using an ultraviolet light to transform a liquid mixture into a solid. Photoinitiators play a crucial role in photopolymerization and are used in many commercial applications including 3D printing, inks, adhesives, electronics, and coatings. Because of the use of photoinitiators, the photopolymerization process is solvent-free and does not release volatile organic compounds, allowing it to be ecologically friendly.

The scope of applications of photoinitiators is expansive and increasing, especially within the biomedical field. Photocured polymer composites are used in dentistry for filling tissue cavities. In other medical fields, these processes can be used in tissue engineering, bioimaging, drug delivery systems, and medical devices. In medical applications of photopolymerization, the performance of the products is necessary, requiring the research of new types of non-toxic photoinitiating systems. For photoinitiators to be effective in use they must have high polymerization efficiency, a low production cost, proficient absorption in the visible spectrum, and good solubility in the reaction mixture.

Some small molecules in the atmosphere can also act as photoinitiators by decomposing to give free radicals (in photochemical smog). For instance, nitrogen dioxide (NO_{2}) is produced in large quantities by gasoline-burning internal combustion engines. NO_{2} in the troposphere gives smog its brown coloration and catalyzes production of toxic ground-level ozone (O_{3}). Molecular oxygen (O_{2}) also serves as a photoinitiator in the stratosphere, breaking down into atomic oxygen and combining with O_{2} in order to form the ozone in the ozone layer.

== Types ==
In free radical polymerization, there are two types of photoinitiators to be distinguished:

Type I photoinitiators are molecules that form the reactive species through direct absorption of the UV light by the molecule itself, breaking it apart in a process called cleavage.

Type II photoinitiators require a co-initiator. In this process, the light is absorbed and the photoinitiator reaches an excited state either takes a hydrogen atom from or transfers electrons with a donor molecule (the co-initiator). Amines, alcohols, or silanes serving as the electron donor or hydrogen source are common co-initiators.

Since type I photoinitiators have quicker absorption processes and have higher efficiency, they are the most widely applied, but type II initiators often have more favorable visible-light absorption properties.

When comparing types of photoinitiators for different applications, advantages and disadvantages are evaluated such as use of a co-initiator, absorption in specific wavelengths, pigmentation, and time of photoinitiation required.

== Reactions ==
Photoinitators can create reactive species by different pathways including photodissociation and electron transfer. As an example of dissociation, hydrogen peroxide can undergo homolytic cleavage, with the O−O bond cleaving to form two hydroxyl radicals.

H_{2}O_{2} → 2 ·OH

Certain azo compounds (such as azobisisobutyronitrile), can also photolytically cleave, forming two alkyl radicals and nitrogen gas:

RCH_{2}−N=N−H_{2}CR → 2 RCH_{2} + N_{2}

These free radicals can now promote other reactions.

== Origin and Examples ==
Commercial photoinitiators currently used are often of synthetic origin and environmentally unfriendly. Additionally, they have disadvantages including high synthesis cost, cytotoxicity, and solubility problems. The table below details some common synthetic photoinitiators.

Commonly Used Synthetic Origin Photoinitiators
| Photoinitiator | Type | Uses | Absorption Spectrum |
|---|---|---|---|
| CQ (camphorquinone) | Type II | dental resin | between 430 to 510 nm |
| TPO (2,4,5–trimethylbenzoyldiphenylphosphine oxide) | Type I | dental resin, hydrogels | between 380 and 425 nm |
| BAPO (bisacylphosphine oxide) | Type I | dental resin | between 365 and 416 nm |
| BP (benzophenone) | Type II | dental resin | between 320 and 370 nm and 240 and 300 nm |

Gaining more attention are photoinitiators of natural origin, which have lesser toxicity and higher biocompatibility. Because these naturally derived photoinitiators demonstrate nontoxicity to human cells, their application in fields such as regenerative medicines is promising. The table below details some common naturally derived photoinitiators.

Commonly Used Naturally Origin Photoinitiators
| Photoinitiator | Type | Use | Source | Absorption Spectrum |
|---|---|---|---|---|
| Riboflavin (7,8-dimethyl-10-ribityl-isoalloxazine) | Type II | hydrogels in drug delivery, dermal filler | milk, eggs, fish, vegetables like broccoli and asparagus | between 220 and 450 nm |
| Coumarins (2H-1-benzopyran-2-one) | Type I and II | 3D printing, drug delivery, tissue engineering, biomaterials, dental resin | bacteria (Streptomyces), fungal (Aspergillus), plants like green tea, cloudberry, tonka beans | between 270 and 510 nm |
| Flavones | Type II | 3D printing | vegetables like celery and parsley, citrus fruits, and chamomile flowers | between 350 and 470 nm |
| Curcumin (E,E)-1,7-bis(4-hydroxy-3-methoxy-phenyl)-1,6-heptadiene-3,5-dione | Type II | hydrogels, antibacterial coatings | extracted from turmeric | between 350 and 750 nm |

== Atmospheric photoinitiators ==
=== Peroxides ===
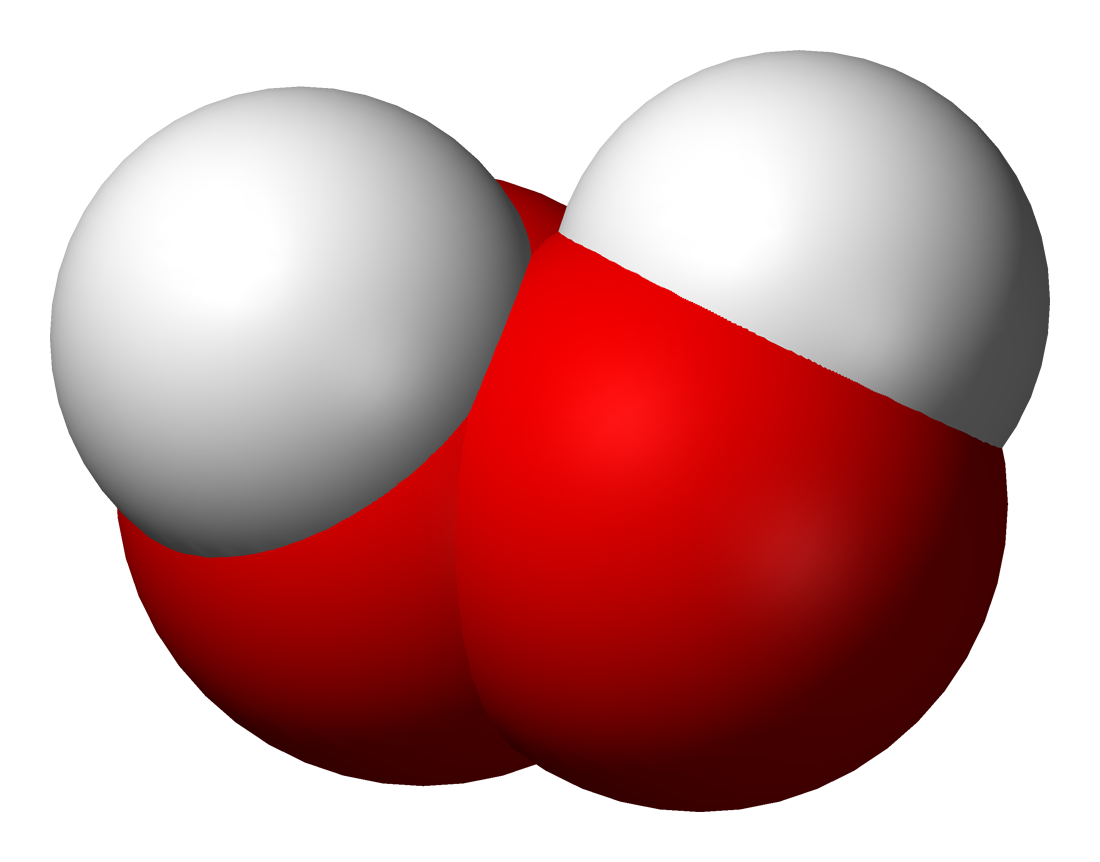
Hydrogen peroxide, the simplest peroxide

Since molecular oxygen can abstract H atoms from certain radicals, the HOO· radical is easily created. This particular radical can further abstract H atoms, creating H_{2}O_{2}, or hydrogen peroxide; peroxides can further cleave photolytically into two hydroxyl radicals. More commonly, HOO can react with free oxygen atoms to yield a hydroxyl radical (·OH) and oxygen gas. In both cases, the ·OH radicals formed can serve to oxidize organic compounds in the atmosphere.

H_{2}O_{2} → 2 ·OH
HOO· + O → O_{2} + ·OH

·OH + CH_{4} → ·CH_{3} + H_{2}O

=== Nitrogen dioxide ===
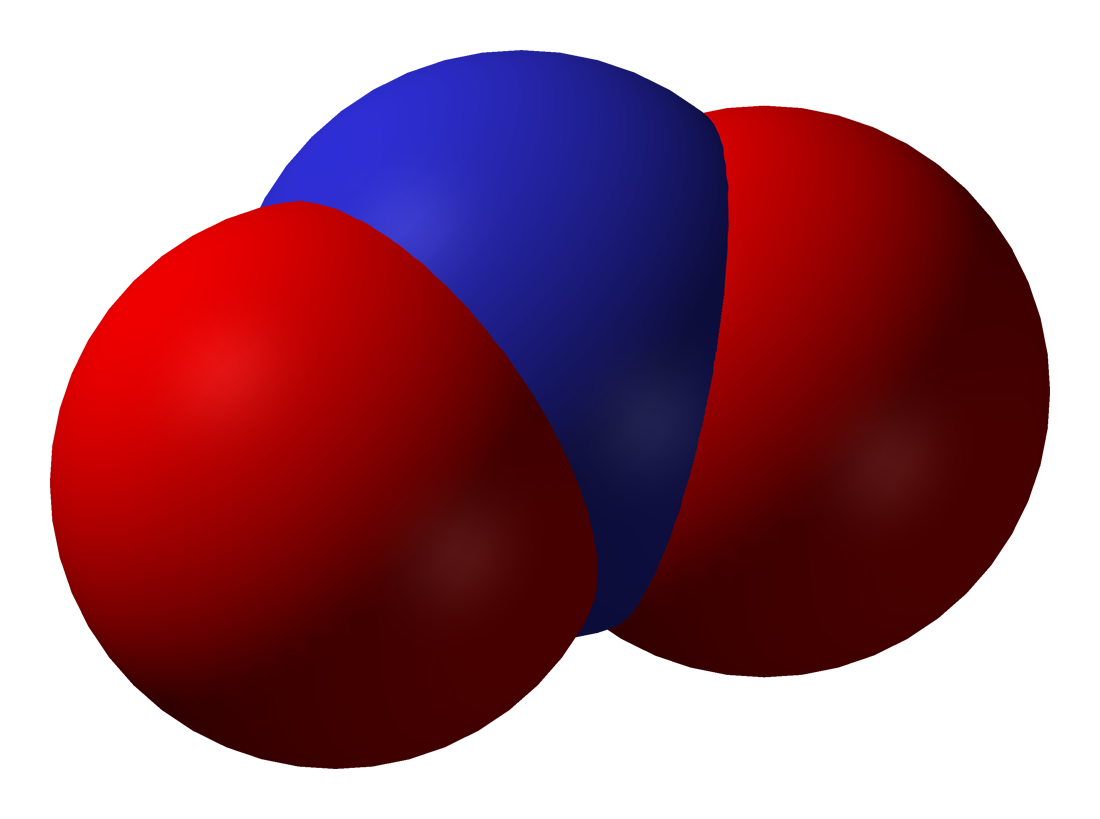
Nitrogen dioxide, a large contributor to the production of smog

Nitrogen dioxide can also be photolytically cleaved by photons of wavelength less than 400 nm producing atomic oxygen and nitric oxide.

NO_{2} → NO + O

Atomic oxygen is a highly reactive species, and can abstract a H atom from anything, including water.

O + H_{2}O → 2 ·OH

Nitrogen dioxide can be regenerated through a reaction between certain peroxy-containing radicals and NO.

ROO· + NO → NO_{2} + RO·

=== Molecular oxygen ===
In the stratosphere, molecular oxygen (O_{2}) is an important photoinitiator that begins the ozone-production process in the ozone layer. Oxygen can be photolyzed into atomic oxygen by light with wavelength less than 240 nm.

O_{2} → 2O

Atomic oxygen can then combine with more molecular oxygen to form ozone.

O + O_{2} → O_{3}

However, ozone can also be photolyzed back into O and O_{2}.

O_{3} → O + O_{2}

Furthermore, atomic oxygen and ozone can combine into O_{2}.

O + O_{3} → 2 O_{2}

This set of reactions govern the production of ozone and can be combined to calculate its equilibrium concentration.

== Commercial photoinitiators and uses ==
=== AIBN ===
Azobisisobutyronitrile, a commonly used industrial photoinitiator, and its breakdown into two radicals and nitrogen gas

Azobisisobutyronitrile is a white powder often used as a photoinitiator for vinyl-based polymers such as polyvinyl chloride, also known as PVC. Because this particular photoinitiator produces nitrogen gas (N_{2}) upon decomposition, it is often used as a blowing agent to change the shape and/or texture of plastics.

=== Benzoyl peroxide ===
Benzoyl peroxide, a common photoinitiator used in plastics production and in acne medication

Benzoyl peroxide, much like azobisisobutyronitrile, is a white powder used as a photoinitiator in various commercial and industrial processes, including plastics production. Unlike AIBN, however, benzoyl peroxide produces oxygen gas upon decomposing, giving this compound a host of medical uses as well.

Upon contact with the skin, benzoyl peroxide breaks down, producing oxygen gas, among other things. The oxygen gas is absorbed into the pores of the skin, where it kills off the acne-causing bacterium Cutibacterium acnes.

In addition, the free radicals produced can break down dead skin cells. Clearing out these dead cells prevents pore blockage and, by extension, acne breakouts.

=== 2,2-Dimethoxy-2-phenylacetophenone ===
example of acrylate polymerization via radical photoinitiation. This type of hydrogel is sometimes used for biosensors as the conditions used are relatively mind to protein allowing them to be entrapped in the hydrogel, whilst retaining functionality and are porous enough to allow the diffusion of small molecules.

=== Camphorquinone ===
Camphorquinone (CQ) is a photosensitiser used with an amine system, that generates primary radicals with light irradiation. These free electron then attack the double bonds of resin monomers resulting in polymerization. The physical properties of the cured resins are affected by the generation of primary radicals during the initial stage of polymerization.

=== Irgacure 819 ===
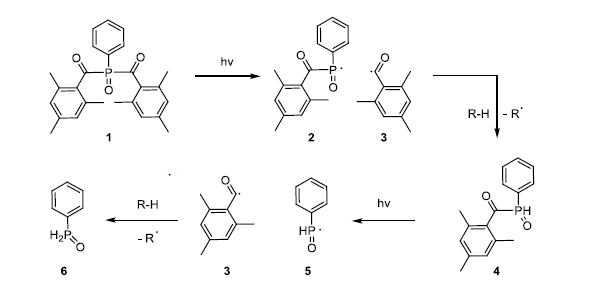
Mechanism of Irgacure 819 to form 4 radicals.

Irgacure 819 (BAPO Bis(2,4,6-trimethylbenzoyl)-phenylphosphineoxide) is a Norrish type photoinitiator used in polymerization processes like two-photon polymerization. When exposed to light it forms four radicals (2, 3, 5) per decomposed molecule (1), making it highly efficient in initiating polymerization. The second set of radicals forms through abstraction or chain transfer, further driving the reaction.

== See also ==
- Radical initiator

== Bibliography ==
- vanLoon, Gary W.; Duffy, Stephen J. (2005). Environmental Chemistry: A Global Perspective. New York, NY: Oxford University Press. ISBN 0-19-927499-1.
