= Osseointegration Group of Australia =

Australian organisation

The Osseointegration Group of Australia is an Australian organisation founded by Sydney orthopedic surgeon and osseointegration specialist Munjed Al Muderis. The Osseointegration Group of Australia Team is made up of specialists from various fields including prosthetics, physio, rehabilitation, anesthesia and psychology.

Osseointegration surgery involves the insertion of a titanium implant into the femur or tibia of an amputee. The implant than connects with an external prosthetic component which eliminates the need for traditional rigid socket prosthetics. The surgery and the follow-up from the team aims to provide patients with a greater quality of life through increased mobility and reduced discomfort. The group offers support before and after the surgery providing rehabilitation, physiotherapy and pain management.

== Notable surgeries ==
The Osseointegration Group of Australia clinics at Norwest Private Hospital in Sydney are known worldwide as centres of excellence, according to NEWS. Muderis and the Osseointegration Group of Australia have treated several Paralympian, cancer patients and traumatic amputees from both Australia and overseas.

In 2011, Muderis and the Osseointegration Group of Australia performed the first Australian osseointegration surgery on Paralympian Brendan Burkett. Burkett is a medal holding Australian swimmer who in his teen years was involved in a motorbike accident that caused the loss of his leg. His surgery was successfully performed at Macquarie University Hospital.

In 2012, another Australian Paralympic athlete, Kerrod McGregor, underwent a successful Osseointegration surgery. Kerrod was Australia's 23rd patient to have undergone the Osseointegration Implant surgery.

In April 2012, Muderis and the Osseontegration Group of Australia was responsible for the surgery provide an artificial limb for Marny Cringle, 42. Marny In a world first procedure, she became the first person in the world to be fitted with a bionic limb after lengthening her bone by two inches as the remaining stump after her amputation was too short for a prosthetic limb to be fitted. Her successful surgery set a precedent for possible achievements in the case of thousands other amputees.

Jamie Bertoux, a double amputee from London, was the first overseas patient to travel to Australia to have osseointegration surgery under the care of the Osseointegration Group of Australia. Osseointegration patient Phil Coulson from Nelson in New Zealand became the first New Zealander to be fitted with a bionic leg. Osseointregration Group of Australia conducted their first American implant surgery on Fred Hernandez in April 2013.

In other firsts, Iain McGregor from New Zealand was the first patient in the southern hemisphere to go straight from amputation to bionic leg. Miranda Cashin was the first congenital amputee to receive the surgery.

In 2013, Muderis and the Osseointegration Group of Australia met Michael Swain, a former British soldier in his Sydney clinic. Michael Swain was a British rifleman who was 20 years old when he lost his leg in the Taliban Bomb Blast in Afghanistan that took place in November 2009. For 18 months, he tried learning how to walk with prosthetic legs but he was still relatively immobile. After osseointegration surgery, Swain, a double amputee has been able to return an active and mobile life.
