= Brendan Burkett =

Australian Paralympic swimmer

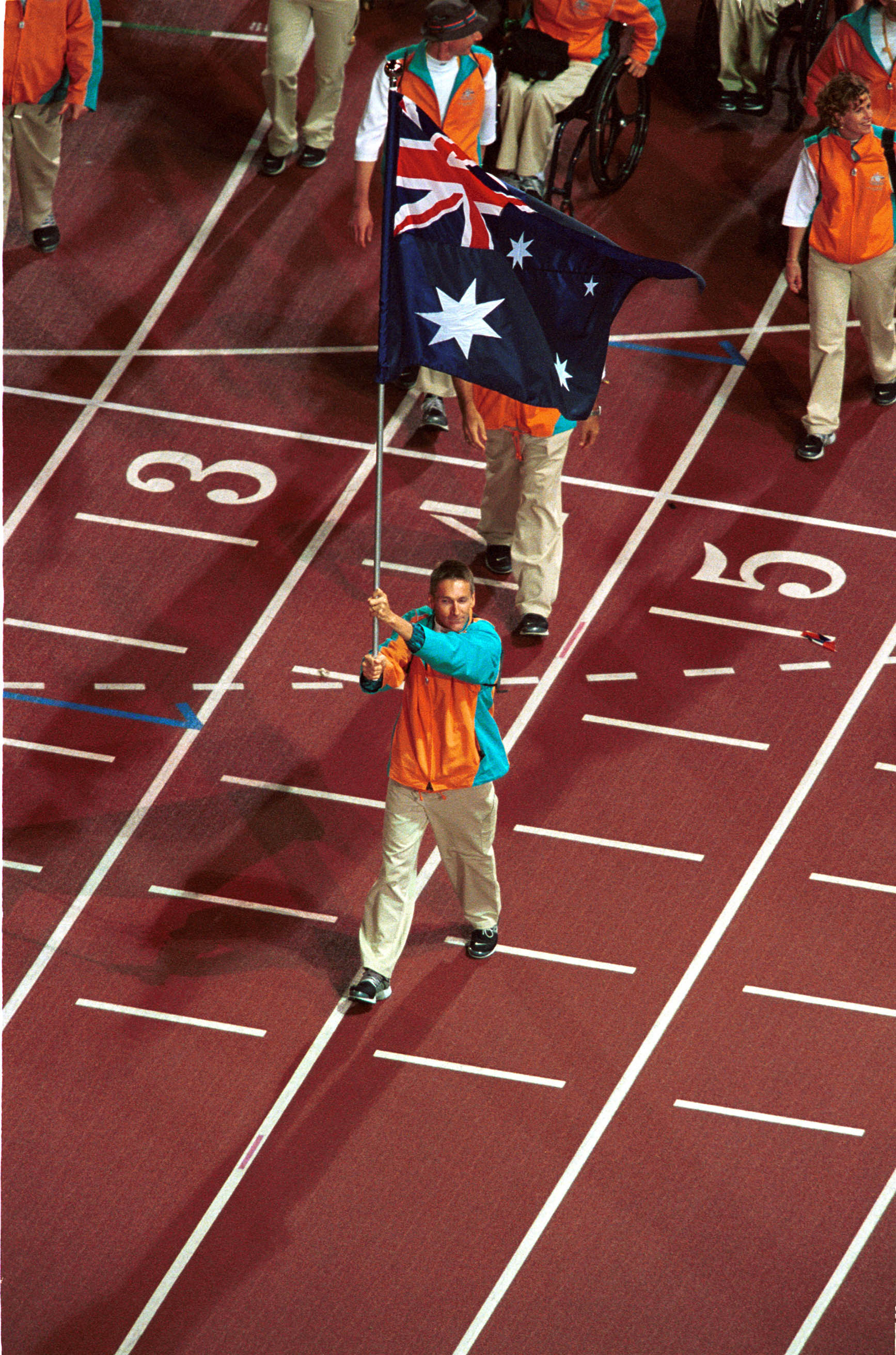
- Burkett leads the Australian Paralympic Team as the flag bearer in the Athletes Parade at the 2000 Summer Paralympics Opening Ceremony

Personal information
- Full name: Brendan John Burkett
- Nationality: Australian
- Born: 7 October 1963 (age 63) Brisbane, Queensland
Medal record
Swimming
Paralympic Games
Gold medal – first place	1996 Atlanta	Men's 50 m Freestyle S9
Silver medal – second place	1988 Seoul	Men's 4 × 50 m Freestyle Relay A1–A8
Silver medal – second place	1996 Atlanta	Men's 4 × 100 m Freestyle S7–10
Silver medal – second place	2000 Sydney	Men's 4 × 100 m Freestyle 34 pts
Bronze medal – third place	1992 Barcelona	Men's 50 m Freestyle S9
IPC Swimming World Championships
Gold medal – first place	1998 Christchurch	Men's 4 x 100m Freestyle Open
World Championships and Games for the Disabled
Bronze medal – third place	1990 Assen	Men's 4x100m Freestyle Relay S7
Commonwealth Games
Silver medal – second place	1994 Victoria	Men's 100 m Freestyle S9

Brendan John Burkett, OAM (born 7 October 1963) is an Australian swimmer who won five medals at four Paralympics and a silver medal at the 1994 Victoria Commonwealth Games.

== Personal ==
Burkett was born on 7 October 1963 as one of six children in Brisbane. He grew up in the Queensland town of Tannum Sands, near Gladstone. He was the captain of his local rugby league team, and was hoping for a career in the sport; in 1984 he represented country Queensland in a rugby team that toured New Zealand.

On 21 December 1985, the day of his graduation from Central Queensland University, he was involved in a hit-and-run accident while riding a motorcycle. His left leg was smashed in thirteen places and it was amputated ten days later.

He received a Bachelor of Engineering degree from the Central Queensland University in 1985, and a Master of Engineering degree from the Queensland University of Technology in 1986. He also has a PhD in Biomechanics from the Queensland University of Technology. He worked for five years as a consultant engineer, one of which was spent on the North Sea; he was the first person with a disability to work on an oil rig there.

In 1998, he became a professor at the University of the Sunshine Coast. In 1999, he helped the Australia national rugby union team prepare for that year's Rugby World Cup. He was the Australian Paralympic swimming team's national sport science coordinator for the 2002 World Championships, the 2004 Paralympic Games, and the 2006 World Championships. As of 25 October 2011, he was the acting dean of the Faculty of Science, Health and Education at the University of the Sunshine Coast, where he was also serving as the director of the Centre for Healthy Activities, Sport and Exercise. His research areas include human health and performance (including technology and software developments in the area ) and sports biomechanics.

In 2008, while he was camping with his family in Noosa, Queensland, his artificial waterproof leg was stolen.

In 2011, Burkett had successful osseointegration surgery at Macquarie University Hospital performed by Munjed Al Muderis of The Osseointegration Group of Australia.

== Swimming career ==
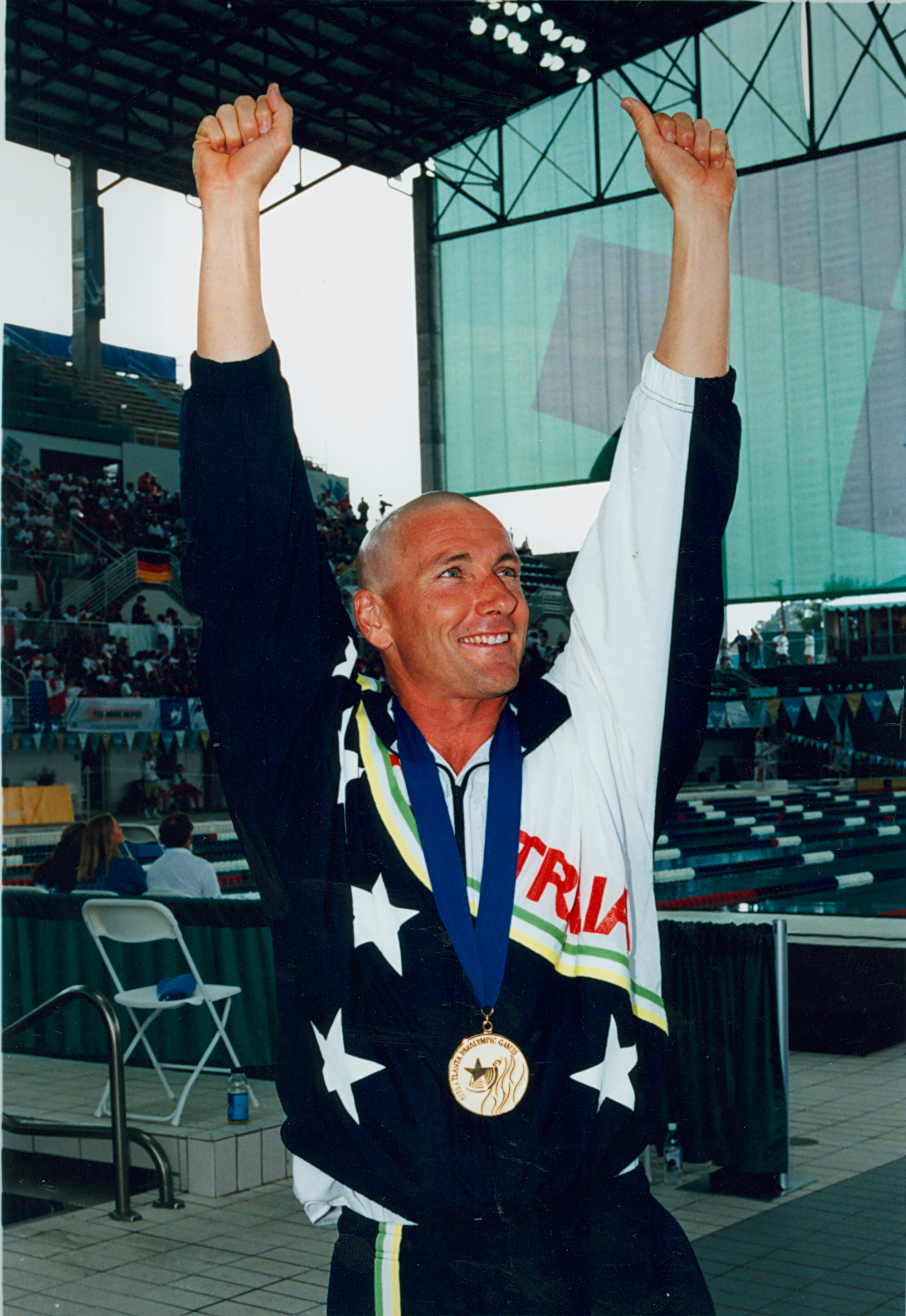
Burkett at the 1996 Atlanta Paralympics

Burkett first represented Australia at the 1987 Pan Pacific Para-Swimming Championships, where he won a gold medal in the 100 m butterfly. At the 1988 Seoul Games, he won a silver medal in the Men's 4 × 50 m Freestyle Relay A1–A8 event. At the 1992 Barcelona Games, he won a bronze medal in the Men's 50 m Freestyle S9 event. He won a silver medal at the 1994 Victoria Commonwealth Games in the Men's 100 m Freestyle S9 event. At the 1996 Atlanta Games, he was the captain of the Australian Paralympic team. At the games, he won a gold medal in the Men's 50 m Freestyle S9 event, for which he received a Medal of the Order of Australia, and a silver medal in the Men's 4 × 100 m Freestyle S7–10 event. At the 1998 IPC Swimming World Championships in Christchurch, he was part of the Australian team that won a gold medal and broke a world record in the 4 × 100 m Freestyle Relay event. He won a gold medal and again broke a world record in the Men's 50 m Freestyle S9 event at the 1999 European Championships; his father had died earlier that year. He carried the Australian flag at the opening ceremony of the 2000 Sydney Games. At the Games, he won a silver medal in the Men's 4 × 100 m Freestyle 34 pts event; he was very disappointed that he could not defend his 50 m freestyle title. He retired from competitive swimming after the 2000 games.

In September 2018, he was appointed Australian Paralympic Swimming Head Coach.

== Recognition ==
In 1988, Burkett won an Australia Day Sporting Award. In 1998, Burkett was inducted into the Sunshine Coast Sports Hall of Fame. In 2000, he received the Professional Engineer of the Year Award from the Institution of Engineers Australia. That year, he also received an Australian Sports Medal. In 2007, Burkett became a member of Swimming Queensland's Hall of Fame. In 2008, he was a member of the long-term health strategy group at the Australia 2020 Summit. He received the Outstanding Service to Swimming Australia Award in 2009. In 2009 Burkett was inducted into the Queensland Sport Hall of Fame.In 2026, he was awarded the International Paralympic Committee’s Scientific Award, honouring a lifetime of contribution to advancing Para sport and improving outcomes for athletes with a disability.
