= Kerrod McGregor =

Australian Paralympic athlete

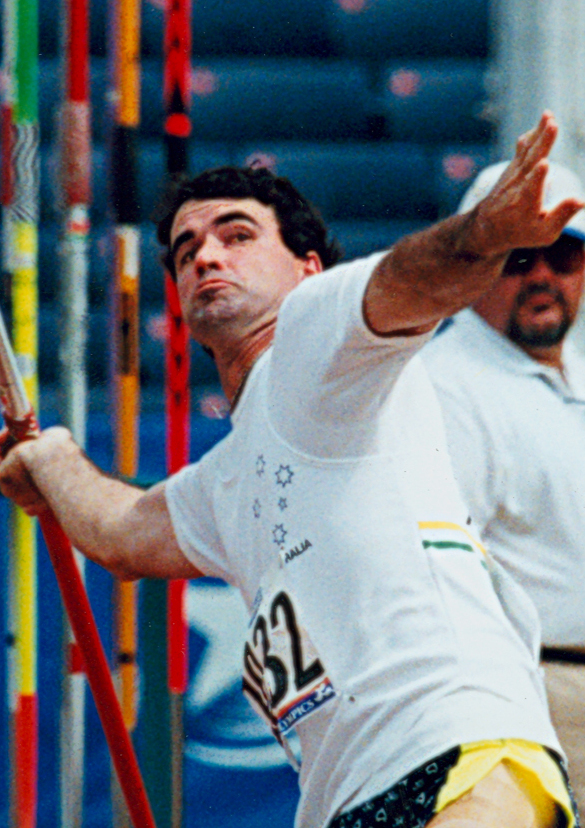
- Australian athlete Kerrod McGregor competes in the P42 pentathlon event at the 1996 Atlanta Paralympic Games in which he won a silver medal.

Personal information
- Full name: Kerrod Glenn McGregor
- Nationality: Australia
- Born: 23 April 1962 (age 64)

Sport
- Disability class: P42
Medal record
Men's para athletics
Representing Australia
Paralympic Games
Gold medal – first place	1984 New York	Javelin throw A2
Gold medal – first place	1984 New York	Long jump A2
Gold medal – first place	1988 Seoul	Discus throw A2/A9
Silver medal – second place	1984 New York	Discus throw A2
Silver medal – second place	1984 New York	100m A2/A9
Silver medal – second place	1992 Barcelona	Pentathlon PS3
Silver medal – second place	1996 Atlanta	Pentathlon P42
Bronze medal – third place	1988 Seoul	Long jump A2/A9
Bronze medal – third place	1984 New York	Javelin throw A2/A9

Kerrod Glenn McGregor (born 23 April 1962) is an Australian Paralympic athlete competing mainly in category P42 pentathlon events.

He was born 23 April 1962 in Gladstone, Queensland. He competed in the 1984 Summer Paralympics in New York City, United States. There he won a gold medal in the men's Javelin throw - A2 event, a gold medal in the men's Long jump - A2 event, a silver medal in the men's Discus throw - A2 event, finished fifth in the men's High jump - A2 event and finished fifth in the men's Shot put - A2 event. He also competed at the 1988 Summer Paralympics in Seoul, South Korea, where he received a gold medal in the men's Discus throw - A2A9 event, a silver medal in the men's 100 metres - A2A9 event, a bronze medal in the men's Long jump - A2A9 event, a bronze medal in the men's Javelin throw - A2A9 event and finished ninth in the men's High jump - A2A9 event. He also competed at the 1992 Summer Paralympics in Barcelona, Spain, where he received a silver medal in the men's Pentathlon - PS3 event, finished ninth in the men's 100 metres - TS1 event, finished tenth in the men's Discus throw - THS2 event, finished sixth in the men's Javelin throw - THS2 event, finished fourth in the men's Long jump - J1 event and finished sixteenth in the men's Shot put - THS2 event. He competed in the 1996 Summer Paralympics in Atlanta, United States. There he won a silver medal in the men's Pentathlon - P42 event.

In 2012, McGregor had successful osseointegration surgery at Macquarie University Hospital performed by Dr Munjed Al Muderis of The Osseointegration Group of Australia.
