= ISQ =

ISQ may refer to:

- ICMP source quench, a type of messages in Internet Control Message Protocol (ICMP)
- Implant stability quotient
- Independent Schools Queensland, an association with which Brisbane Grammar School is affiliated
- Industrial Skills Qualification, post-secondary vocational qualification in Brunei
- International School of Qingdao, part of the Qingdao MTI International School
- International Studies Quarterly, a political science journal
- International System of Quantities
- IATA/FAA code of Schoolcraft County Airport, an airport in Michigan's Upper Peninsula
