= Ostel (disambiguation) =

Ostel is a commune in France.

Ostel may also refer to:

- Ostel (Berlin), a hostel in Berlin, Germany
- An open-source telephony application, see The Guardian Project (software)

== See also ==
- Ostell
- Osstell
