= Implant (disambiguation) =

An implant is a medical device that affects a biological structure.

Implant may also refer to:

== Types of implants ==
- Brain implant
- Breast implant
- Buttock implant
- Cochlear implant
- Contraceptive implant
- Dental implant
- Fetal tissue implant
- Implantable cardioverter-defibrillator
- Orthopedic implant
- Prosthetic implant
- Retinal implant
- Subdermal implant
- Transdermal implant

== Alternative ==
- Alien implants
- Extraocular implant
- Implant (body modification)
- Implant (Scientology)
- Microchip implant (animal) (human)
- "The Implant", a television episode of Seinfeld

== See also ==
- History of dental treatments
- Implantation (disambiguation)
- Osseointegration
- Osseoincorporation
