= IPG-DET technique =

Dental Technique

IPG-DET technique is a surgical procedure that interfaces with the upper posterior jaw to support dental implants and a future dental prosthesis.

The basis of this technique is a biological process called osseointegration where materials, such as titanium, form an intimate bond to bone. A variable amount of healing time between 4 and 8 months is required for osseointegration before the dental prosthetic is attached to the surface of a load artificial implant. The surgeon can use this method in order to acquire the desired alveolar ridge dimensions so as to achieve implant stability and long-term aesthetic results where is a small amount of bone high in the upper jaw near the maxillary sinuses.

For vertical alveolar ridge deficiencies in the posterior areas of the maxilla, either extensive bone grafting techniques are used, or in most cases sinus floor elevation procedures are performed in order to create the bone height required for implant stability.

With IPG-DET the surgeon can place immediately dental implants by using autologous CGF growth factors, occasionally bone grafts materials as well as autologous stem cells or umbilical cord blood mesenchymal stem cells, in the same session, to increase the bone height in the sinus.

== Procedure ==
IPG-DET technique is a surgical procedure that aims to increase the amount of bone in the maxillary sinus of the posterior maxilla (upper jaw bone), in the area of the premolar and molars and simultaneously insert dental implant in this area.

When natural teeth in the maxilla are lost, the alveolar process begins to remodel and there is insufficient bone volume required for the placement of dental implants based on osseointegration.

The aim of IPG-DET is to introduce additional bone graft into the maxillary sinus at the same time as implant placement, so that more bone graft is available to achieve the initial stability of the dental implant.

In IPG-DET, additional bone is grafted into the maxillary sinus by intentional perforation the Schneiderian membrane (sinus membrane) and sealing the perforation with the pure autologous (from the same patient) biomaterial CGF-CD34+Matrix containing concentrated growth factors (CGF) and CD34-positive mesenchymal stem cells.

The surgeon obtains the autologous CGF-CD34+Matrix biomaterial during the procedure by taking a small blood sample from the same patient. IPG-DET is a similar surgical procedure to maxillary sinus floor augmentation, but with three differences:

1. the intentional perforation of the sinus membrane
2. the use of a purely autologous biomaterial
3. the entire procedure (insertion of the biomaterial, the bone graft and the dental implant) is performed in a single-stage surgery.
