= Patella fracture =

- Other names: Broken kneecap
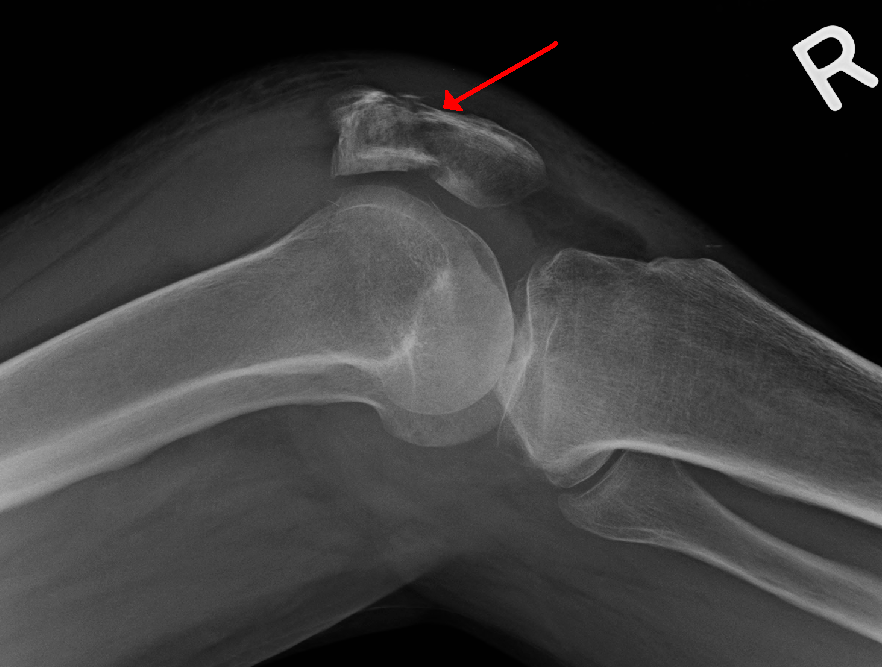
- A fracture of the patella seen on a lateral view
- Specialty: Orthopedics
- Symptoms: Pain, swelling, bruising to front of the knee
- Complications: Injury to the tibia, femur, or knee ligaments
- Types: Stable, displaced, comminuted, open
- Causes: Trauma to the front of the knee
- Diagnostic method: Based on symptom, confirmed with X-rays.
- Differential diagnosis: Bipartite patella
- Treatment: Casting, splinting, surgery
- Prognosis: Generally good with treatment
- Frequency: ~ 1% of fractures

A patella fracture is a break of the kneecap. Symptoms include pain, swelling, and bruising to the front of the knee. A person may also be unable to walk. Complications may include injury to the tibia, femur, or knee ligaments.

It typically results from a hard blow to the front of the knee or falling on the knee.The patella can also be fractured indirectly. For example, a sudden contraction of the quadriceps muscle in the knee can pull apart the patella.Diagnosis is based on symptoms and confirmed with X-rays. In children an MRI may be required.

Treatment may be with or without surgery, depending on the type of fracture. Undisplaced fracture can usually be treated by casting. Even some displaced fractures can be treated with casting as long as a person can straighten their leg without help. Typically the leg is immobilized in a straight position for the first three weeks and then increasing degrees of bending are allowed. Other types of fractures generally require surgery.

Patella fractures make up about 1% of all broken bones. Males are affected more often than females. Those of middle age are most often affected. Outcomes with treatment are generally good.

== Signs and symptoms ==
Also known as a broken kneecap, a patella fracture usually follows a history of trauma and commonly presents with swelling, pain, bruising and inability to both bend and straighten the knee. The pain is worse when trying to stand and the person may be unable to walk. The pain can also be aggravated by prolonged periods of sitting. A painful defect may be felt in the knee and there may be blood in the joint.

=== Complications ===
Complications may include injury to the tibia, femur, or knee ligaments. In the longer term, the knee may not regain full movement, pain may persist and there is an increased likelihood of osteoarthritis of the knee. If there is an associated open wound as in an open fracture, complications also include risk of infection, inability of the broken bones to reunite and osteonecrosis.

== Diagnosis ==
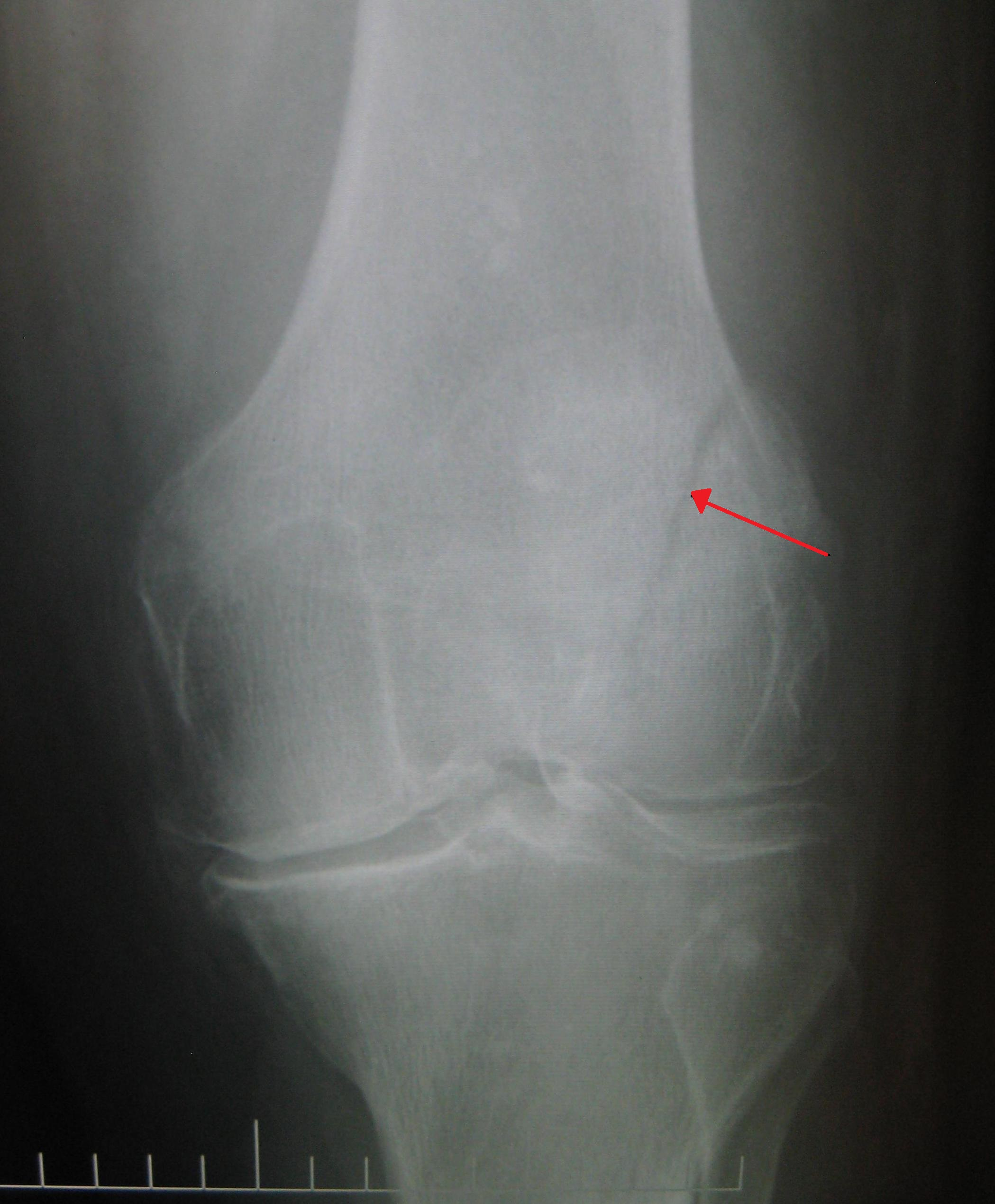
A vertical patella fracture with the fracture line marked by a red arrow

Diagnosis is based on symptoms and confirmed with X-rays. In children an MRI may be required.

=== Differential diagnosis ===
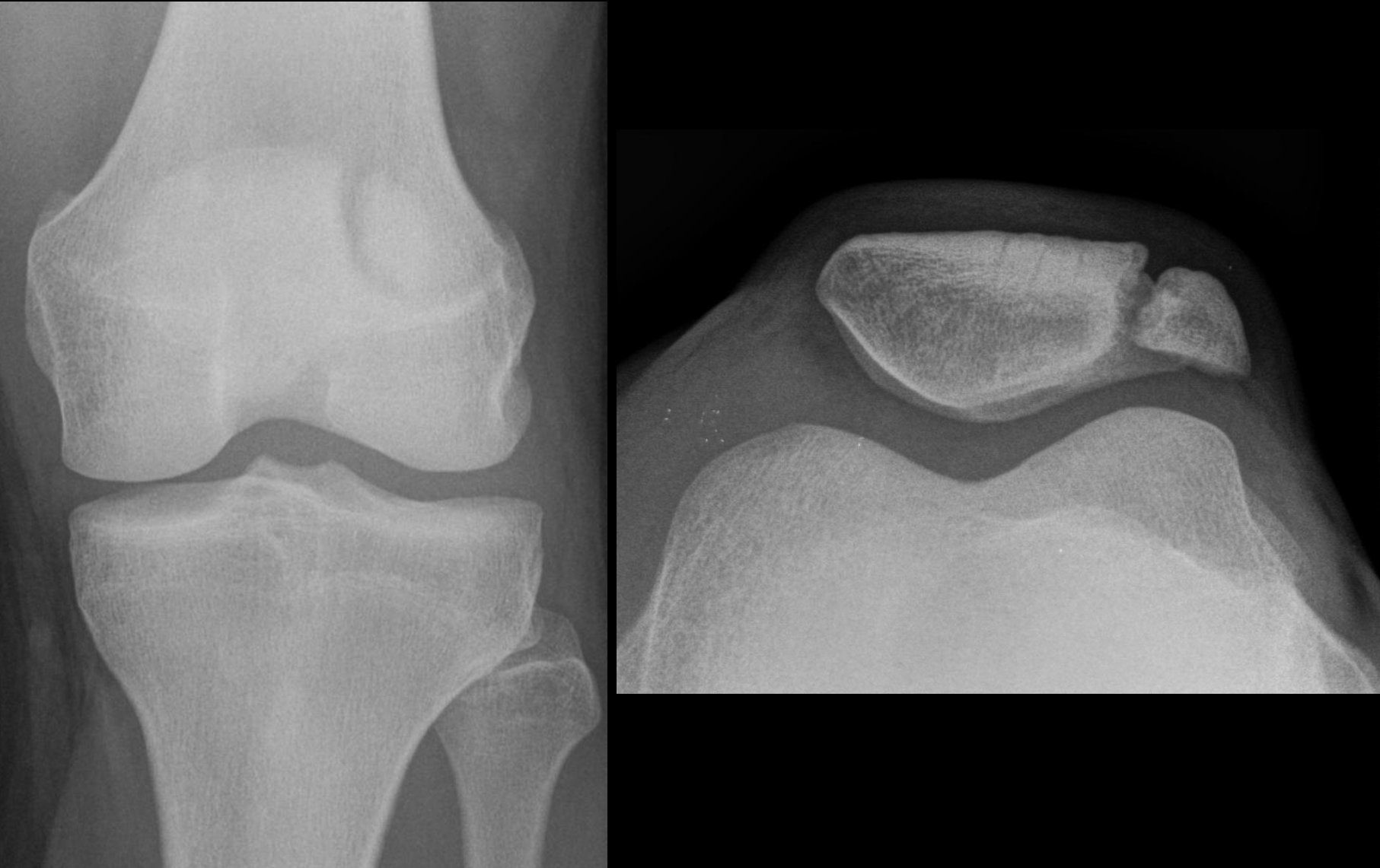
Bipartite patella

Some people have a normal bipartite patella or two-part patella which can appear as a fracture. The fragment is usually seen in the top outer corner of the patella and can be distinguished from a fracture by being present in both knees.

=== Types ===
The patella can break in various ways depending on the way it is injured, and into two or more pieces. Types include transverse, the most common, with one fracture line; marginal; osteochondral; and the rare vertical type, or stellate, where a direct compression force gives rise to a comminuted pattern. Patella fractures can be further classified as displaced, where the broken ends of bone do not line up correctly and separate by more than 2mm, or undisplaced and stable where pieces of bone remain in contact with each other. If fragments of patella bone stick out from the skin it is known as an open patella fracture, and closed if the overlying skin is intact.

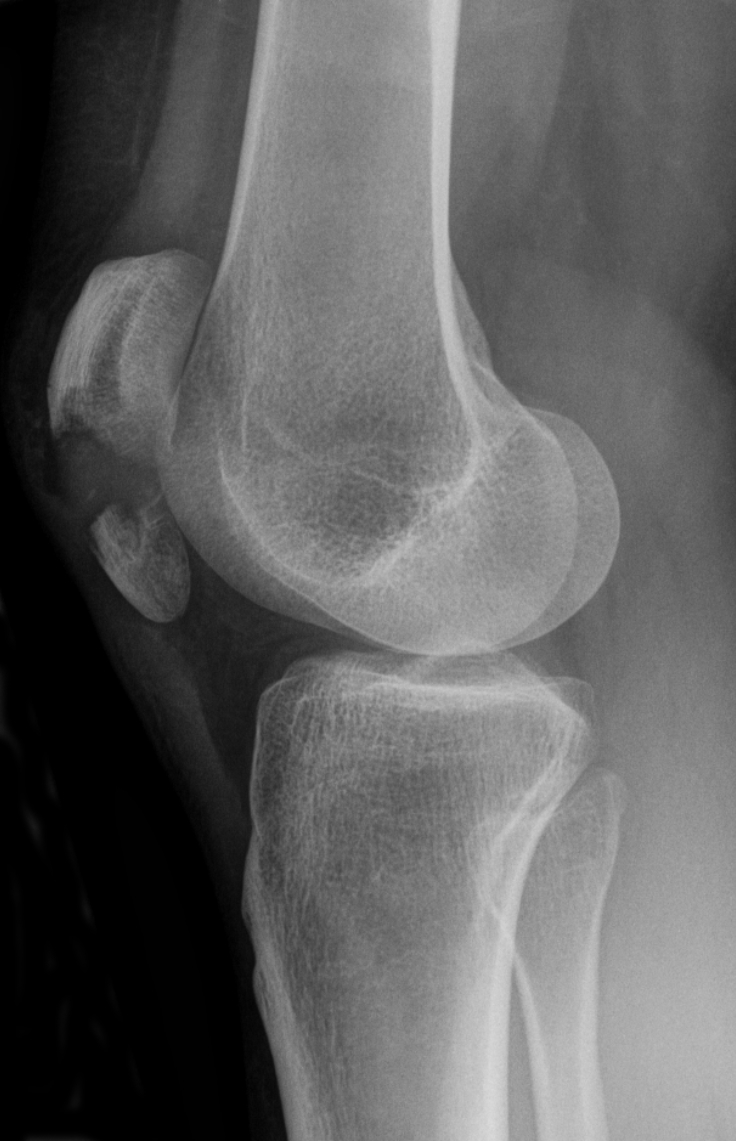
Transverse fracture of patella

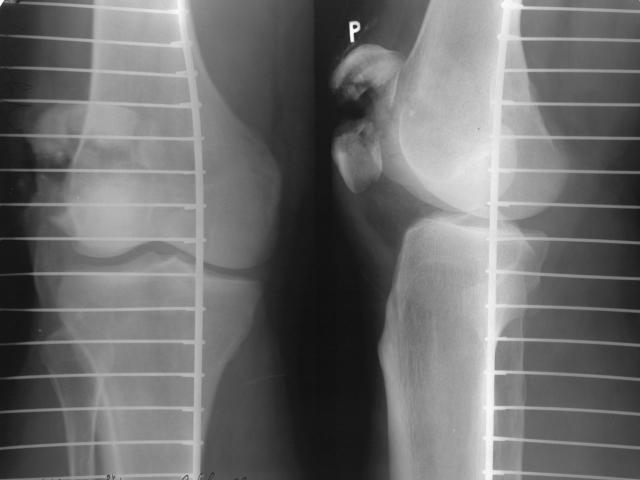
Comminuted fracture of patella

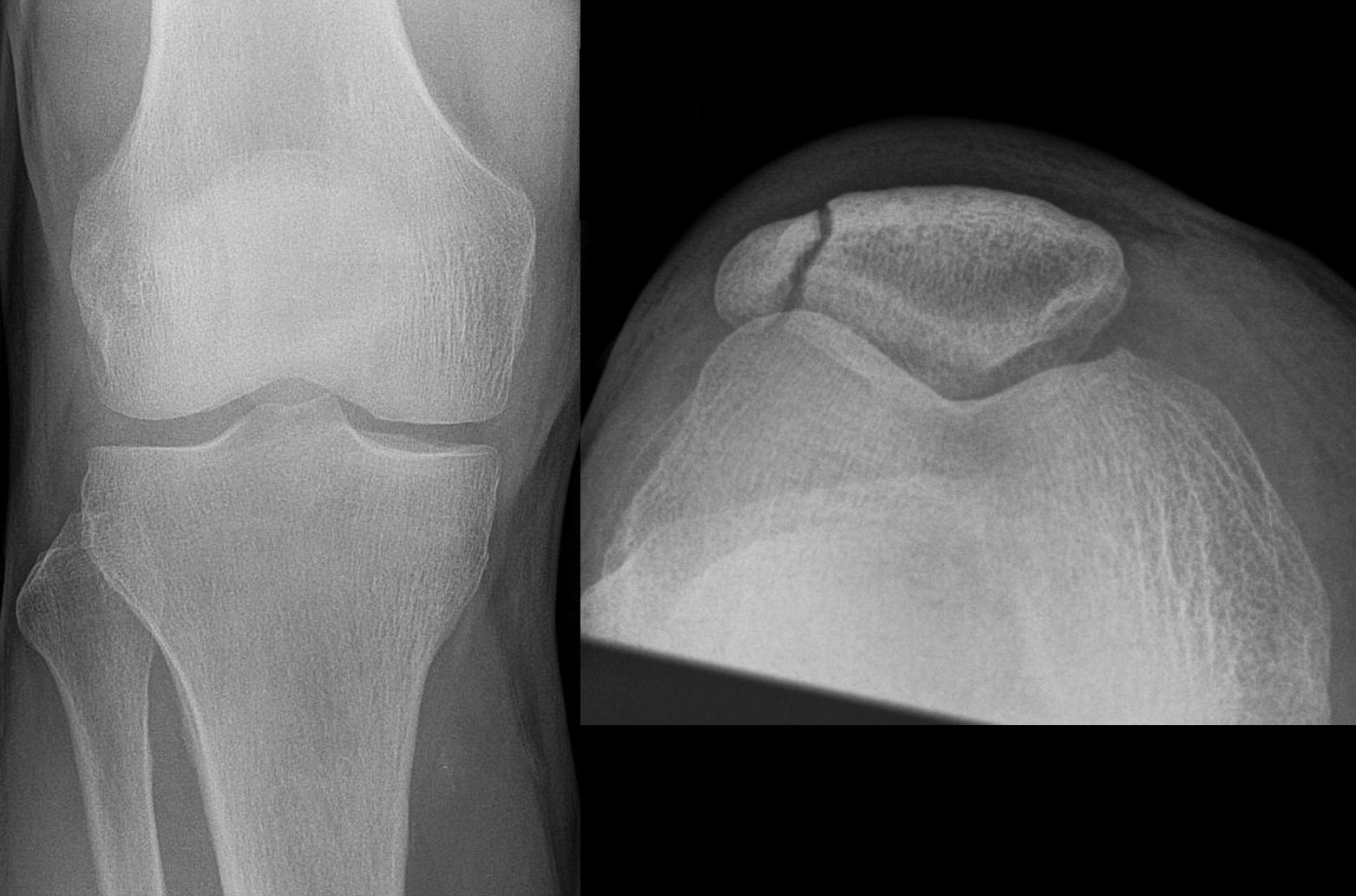
Osteochondral fracture of patella

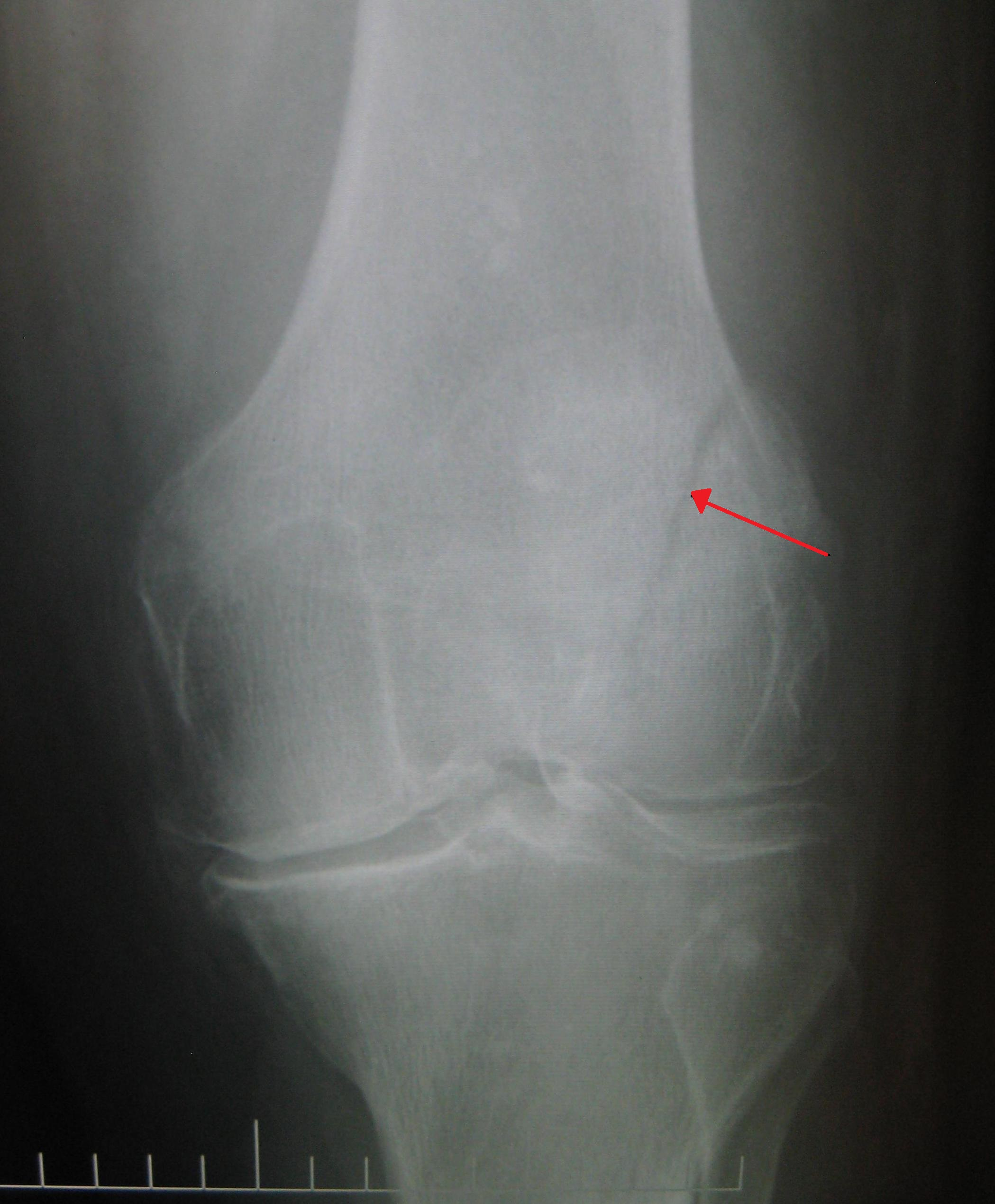
Vertical patella fracture

== Treatment ==
Treatment may be with or without surgery, depending on the type of fracture and whether the overlying skin is intact or broken.

=== Conservative ===
Undisplaced fractures can usually be treated by casting. Even some displaced fractures can be treated with casting as long as the person can straighten their leg without help, thus confirming that the quadriceps mechanism of the leg is intact. In this case the leg is immobilized in a straight position for the first three weeks and then increasing degrees of bending are allowed as healing occurs.

=== Surgery ===
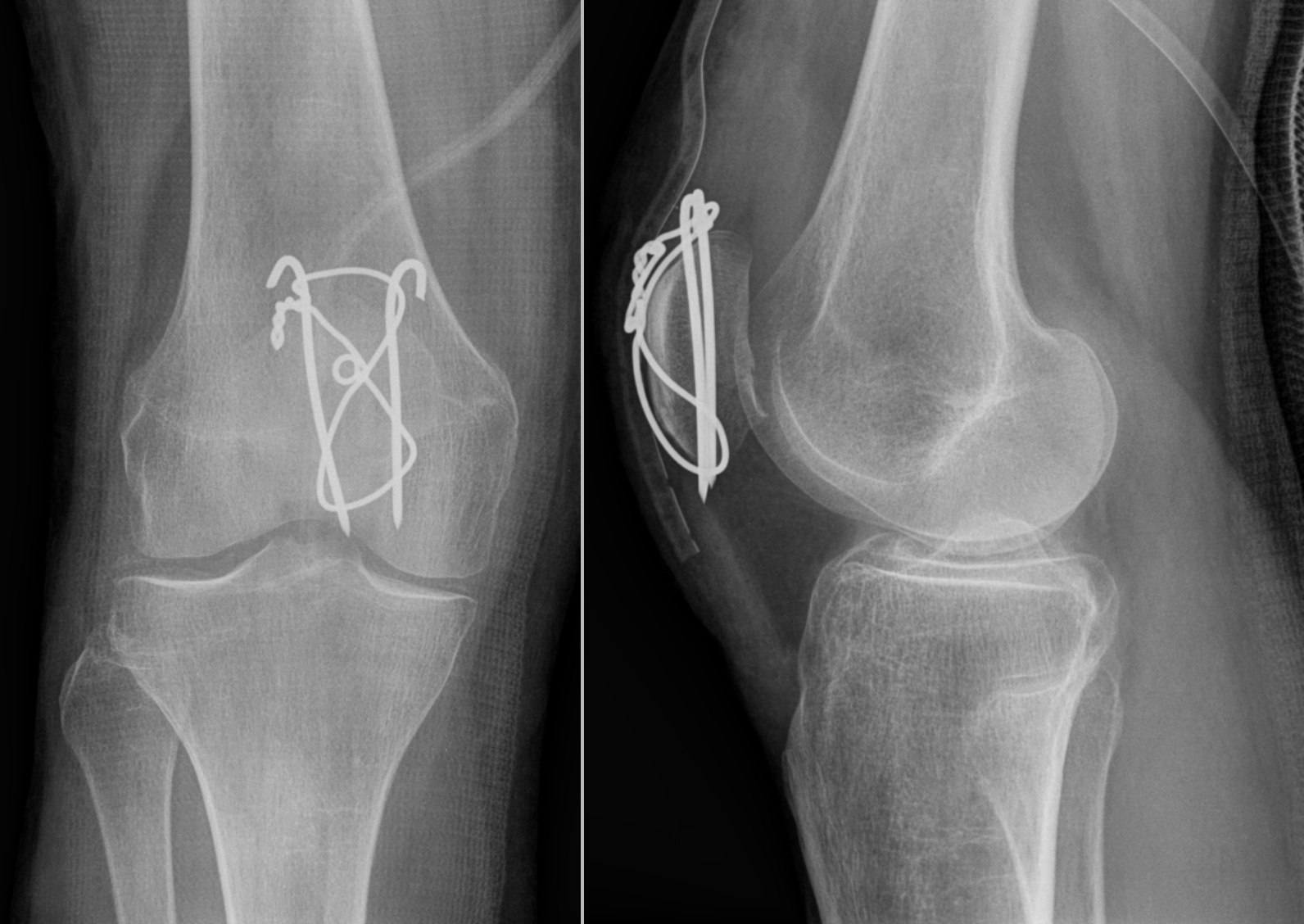
Tension band wiring: front and side view

Most patella fractures are transverse or comminuted, hence the quadriceps mechanism is disrupted and they are treated by a combination of wires in a tension band construct. This unites the fractured bones, reconstructing the straightening mechanism of the leg.

If the patella is broken in several places, that is comminuted, then traditionally a patellectomy (removal of the whole patella) is performed in order to reconstruct the extensor mechanism and prevent the onset of an extension lag at the knee joint, resulting in instability. Some surgeons however would rather opt for internal fixation. A partial patellectomy is removal of only a portion of the patella, and may be carried out if at least 60% of the patella can be maintained.

Open fractures of the patella require emergency treatment with irrigation, debridement and fixation.

=== Rehabilitation ===
Irrespective of surgical or non-surgical resolution to the fracture, a physical therapist can advise on progressive weight-bearing exercises and help with strengthening muscles of the leg, improving range of motion of the knee and in reducing stiffness.

== Prognosis ==
Outcomes with treatment are generally good, unless there is involvement of the articular surface or the quadriceps mechanism. There is an increased risk of developing osteoarthritis in people who have broken their patella.

There is limited evidence supporting the different surgical interventions for treating fractures of the patella in adults. There is also no evidence of trials that could evaluate the effects of surgical treatment compared with the conservative treatment or other different types of conservative interventions.

== Epidemiology ==
Patella fractures make up about 1% of all broken bones. Males are affected more often than females. Those of middle age are most often affected. 6% to 9% of patellar fractures are of the open type. An ageing population and global increase in the number of TKAs (total knee arthroplasty) has led to an increasing number of periprosthetic fractures of which a patella fracture is one type.

== History ==
Prior to the 19th century most patella fractures were treated non-surgically with extension splinting, frequently resulting in poorly joined fragments of bone and long-term pain and disability. Incomplete understanding of the importance of the patella led to the trend of removing the whole patella, also resulting in pain, disability and dissatisfaction. The first open reduction and internal fixation for a patella fracture was performed in 1877 by Scottish surgeon Sir Hector Cameron. Several techniques followed and materials used included metal loops, pins, kangaroo tendons and screws. Significant advances in surgery occurred in the 1950s with the development of banding after Herbert A. Haxton and others demonstrated that the patella was not just to protect the knee but important for straightening the leg. Subsequently, the three surgical treatments for displaced patella fractures became tension banding, partial patellectomy and total patellectomy, the decision of which to use tailored to the individual.

== See also ==
- Knee replacement (total knee arthroplasty, TKA)
