= Nobel Biocare =

Manufacturer of dental implants

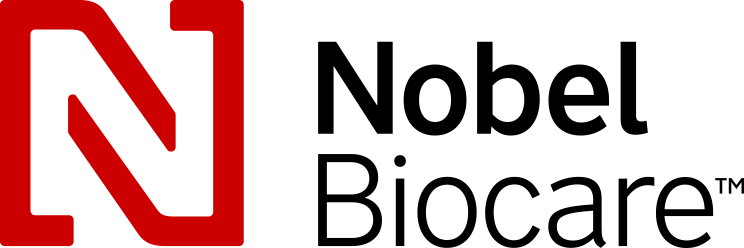
- Nobel Biocare new logo, 2019

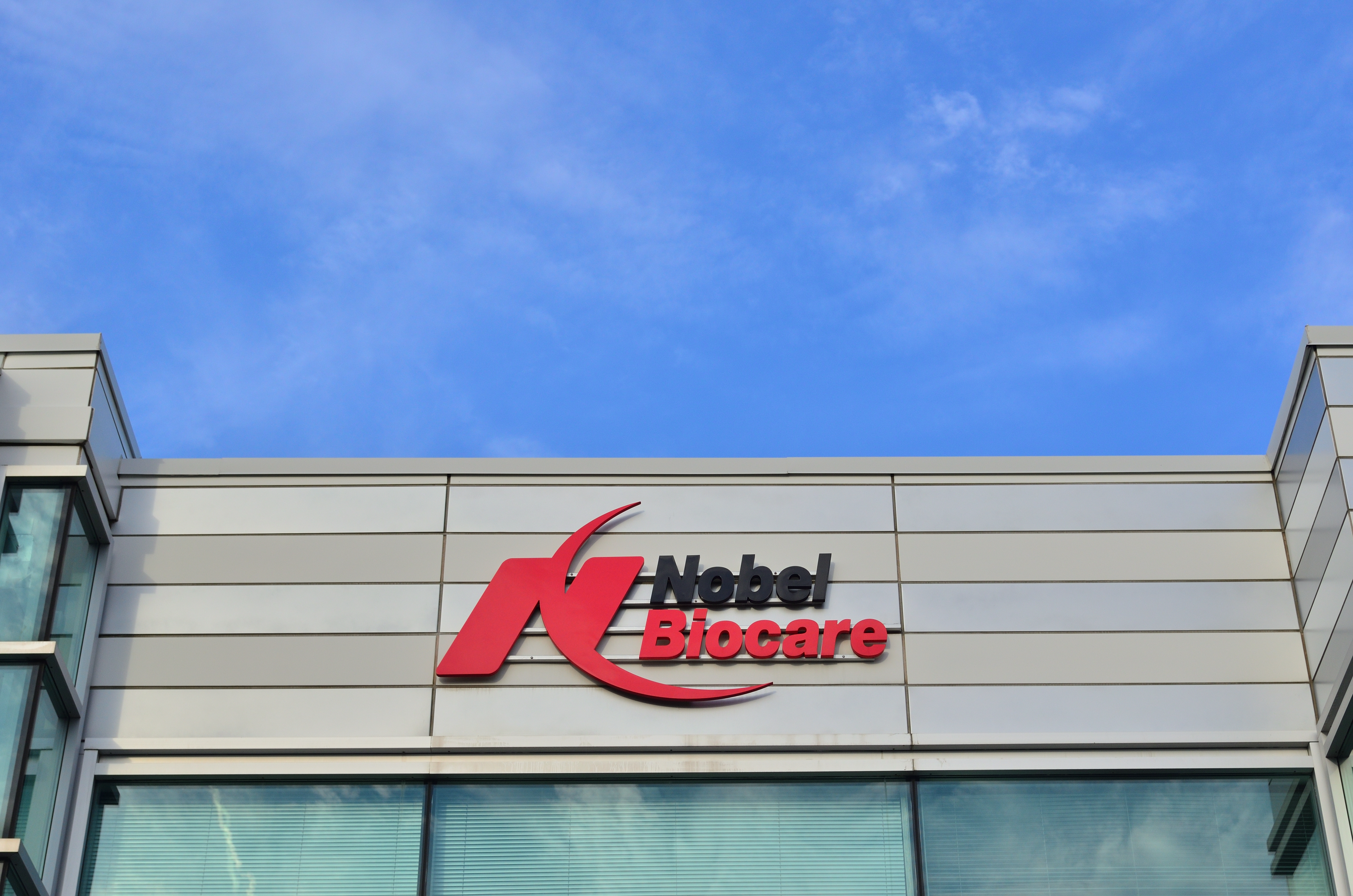
- Nobel Biocare office in Canada
- Type: Aktiengesellschaft
- Industry: Dental Implants and Dental Prosthetics.
- Founded: Karlskoga, Sweden (1981) as Bofors Nobelpharma
- Founder: Professor Per-Ingvar Brånemark, Bofors
- Headquarters: Kloten, canton of Zürich, Switzerland
- Area served: Worldwide
- Key people: Stefan Nilsson (President)
- Products: Dental implants individualized CAD/CAM prosthetics (abutments, crowns, bridges, overdenture bars) scanners 3D diagnostics and planning software components for guided surgery drill motors biomaterials training and education for dental professionals
- Parent: Envista
- Website: nobelbiocare.com

Nobel Biocare is a Swiss company originally founded in Sweden for manufacturing dental implants. It is now headquartered in Kloten, Switzerland near the Zürich Airport. Nobel Biocare in its current form was founded in 2002. It originates from a partnership formed in 1978 between Swedish medical researcher Professor Per-Ingvar Brånemark and Bofors, a Swedish company, to industrialize Brånemark's discovery of osseointegration (the fusing of titanium with bone). Beside dental implants, it also presently develops and commercializes CAD/CAM-based prosthetics equipments to scan teeth and to fabricate individualized dental prosthesis using digital technologies in place of silicone molding.

== Field of activity ==
The core business of the company is the manufacture of dental implants and related products used to treat tooth loss, such as abutments, crowns and bridges. The company also sells scanners and software for designing individualized, patient-specific prosthetics. Nobel Biocare also develops software for diagnostics and implant treatment planning, and produces customized, patient-specific, guided-surgery templates for implant placement surgeries. Since the legal training requirements for clinicians who carry out implant treatment vary from country to country, Nobel Biocare runs a training and education program for dental professionals in several countries.

== History ==
=== The 1970s and 1980s ===
In 1978, the Swedish health authorities approved the insertion of dental implants for clinical purposes, and Brånemark entered into a partnership with Bofors to industrialize his ideas and bring them to a broader market. A new company, Bofors Nobelpharma (later Nobelpharma), was founded in 1981 in Gothenburg, Sweden to commercialize Professor Brånemark's findings. The company launched a number of new products including abutments, drilling equipment and an instrument kit. In 1982, Brånemark presented his results at the Toronto Conference on Osseointegration in Clinical Dentistry. In the same year, the U.S. Food and Drug Administration (FDA) approved the use of titanium dental implants in the United States. In 1983, Dr. Matts Andersson developed the Procera® System of high-precision, repeatable manufacturing of dental crowns. This was a fully automated method for the industrial CAD/CAM production of dental prosthetics. Nobelpharma acquired the new technology in 1988.

After the FDA approval for titanium implants, in 1983, Nobelpharma USA Inc. was established. The company began selling the Brånemark System in the United States. Subsidiaries Nobelpharma Canada Inc. and Nobelpharma Japan Inc. were established in the same decade, along with other offshoots in France, Spain, Australia, Italy, Germany and the UK. The company made a profit for the first time in 1989. In this year, the Swedish National Board of Health and Welfare approved the Procera technique.

=== The 1990s ===
At the turn of the decade, osseointegration, as an observed process, was 25 years old. In 1990, Brånemark System was registered as a trademark in the US. In 1993, in need of further sources of funding to continue its expansion and growth plans, Nobelpharma was listed on the Stockholm Stock Exchange in 1994. In 1996, the company changed its name to Nobel Biocare. Nobel Biocare acquired the American implant manufacturer Steri-Oss Inc. in 1998. In the later part of the decade, Nobel Biocare opened a manufacturing plant in Mahwah, New Jersey, USA.

=== The new century ===
In 2002, the company changed its organizational structure by establishing a domicile in Switzerland with a newly founded group parent company. The primary listing of the shares was changed to the SIX SwissExchange (in 2008, the listing at the OMX Exchange in Stockholm was discontinued). In 2014, Danaher Corporation bought Nobel Biocare and as of 2015 is no longer listed on the SIX SwissExchange.

In July 2018, Danaher announced its intention to spin off its $2.8 billion dental segment into an independent publicly traded company. They named Amir Aghdaei, who at the time was President of Danaher's Dental Platform, to be President and CEO of the new company upon completion of the transaction. The corporate spin-off was completed in December 2019, with the new company called Envista Holdings Corporation.

== Products ==
Nobel Biocare offers dental implants, restorative components, CAD/CAM prosthetics, and biomaterials. Dental implants can replace single or multiple missing teeth. They are placed in a patient's jaw bone to provide a fixation for any prosthetic add-on, such as a crown, similar to the way the root of a tooth provides firm anchoring. There are several implant types that differ in their shape with their use depending on patients’ medical treatment requirements and the clinician's preference. Manufacturing plants for dental implants are based in Karlskoga (Sweden), Yorba Linda (USA), and Tel Aviv (Israel). Under the brand name NobelProcera, Nobel Biocare has a portfolio of dental prosthetic solutions and related components. Manufacturing plants for dental prosthetic solutions are based in Mahwah (USA) and Chiba (Japan). Nobel Biocare develops software for clinicians for diagnosing patients and planning treatments. In 2005, the company introduced guided surgery to the field of dental implantology.

== Footnotes ==
1. “Annual Report 2013” (PDF). Nobel Biocare
2. Nobel Biocare rejects bone loss claims (English), The Local, December 16, 2005
3. All clear for Nobel Biocare (English), The Local, February 7, 2006
4. Danaher acquiers nobel biocare holding (English), The Local, September 15, 2014
