= Tension band wiring =

Orthopaedic internal fixation method

A tension band wire is a form of orthopaedic internal fixation method used to convert distraction forces into compression forces, promoting bone healing.

- Olecranon fracture
- Patella fracture
- Malleolar fracture

== See also ==
- Orthopedic plates
