= EAO =

EAO may refer to:

- East African Orogeny
- East Asian Observatory
- Enefit American Oil
- Ethnic Armed Organisations
- European Association for Osseointegration
- Ford EAO engine
