= Vostell =

Vostell is a surname. Notable people with the surname include:

- David Vostell (born 1960), German-Spanish composer and film director
- Mercedes Vostell (1933–2023), Spanish writer
- Wolf Vostell (1932–1998), German painter and sculptor

== See also ==
- Ostell
