= Dynamic compression plate =

Plate used for internal fixation of bone

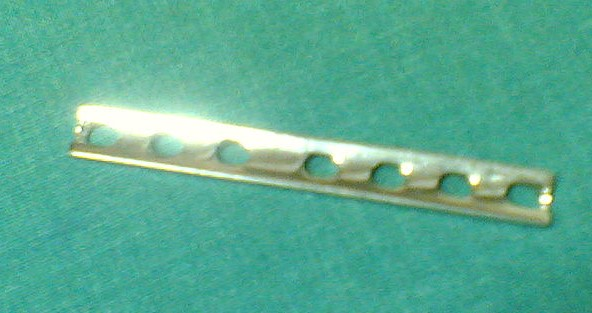
Dynamic compression plate

A dynamic compression plate (DCP) is a metallic plate used in orthopedics for internal fixation of bone, typically after fractures. As the name implies, it is designed to exert dynamic pressure between the bone fragments to be transfixed. Dynamic compression is achieved either by attaching a tension device to a plate or by using a special dynamic compression plate. However, compression plating with a tension device requires a longer surgical incision to allow insertion of the device, and plating carries the possibility of refracture after the plate is removed. A neutralization plate is used to bridge a comminuted fracture; it also transmits bending or torsional forces from the proximal to the distal fragment. Plates used for buttressing prevent collapse by supporting an area of thin cortex or cancellous bone graft.

When plates are used, atrophy (osteopenia) of the bone beneath the plate may predispose the bone to fracture. After removal of plates, fractures may occur through the screw holes.

== Sliding screw plate ==
The sliding screw plate (dynamic compression screw, dynamic hip screw) may be used to treat intertrochanteric fractures as well as other injuries. This device consists of a lag screw and a side plate with a barrel. The sliding screw telescopes and provides fixation while allowing impaction to occur at the fracture during healing and weight bearing. Among the complications of sliding screw plate fixation are "cutting out" of the screw, penetration of the screw into the joint, bending or breaking of the implant, disengagement of the screw from the barrel, and intrapelvic protrusion of the screw.

== See also ==
- Orthopedic plate
