= Ostell =

Ostell is both a given name and a surname. Notable people with the name include:

- John Ostell (1813–1892), English-born Canadian architect
- Ostell Miles (born 1970), American football player

== See also ==
- Ostel (disambiguation)
- Osstell, measurement of the stability of a dental implant
