= Resonance frequency analysis =

Resonance frequency analysis (RFA) is a method used to determine stability (the level of osseointegration) in dental implants. The stability is presented as an implant stability quotient (ISQ) value. The higher the ISQ value the higher the stability.

Utilizing RFA involves sending magnetic pulses to a small metal rod temporarily attached to the implant. As the rod vibrates, the probe reads its resonance frequency and translates it into an ISQ value.

RFA measurements are used to assess the stability of the implant immediately after placement, as well as to measure the stability during the healing time. This helps the dentist determine if further healing time (osseointegration) is needed before the prosthetic tooth is attached, as well as to identify at-risk patients with compromised bone tissue, or other risk factors.

== History ==
Resonance frequency analysis was first suggested as an alternative method of analyzing peri-implant bone in a scientific paper by Meredith N et al. in 1996. As stated in the paper's abstract, in measuring implant stability and osseointegration, “radiographs are of value, but a standardised technique is necessary to ensure repeatability.” The new technique tested involved connecting a small transducer (aluminum rod) to implants. Measurements showed that the resonance frequency increased in direct relation to the increase in the stiffness of the bone-implant interface, thus demonstrating a repeatable and quantitative method of assessing stability.

The method underwent further research and in 1999 the Sweden-based company Osstell AB formed to commercialize the new technique. Osstell developed a device that transmitted vibrational frequencies to a metal peg inserted in the implant and measured the frequency at which resonance was reached. Whereas Meredith et al. measured in the range of 3500–8500 kHz, Osstell developed the Implant Stability Quotient (ISQ) that translated this kHz range to a score 1–100.

Resonance frequency analysis has considerable scientific interest since its advent, largely owing to the increasing number of patients demanding dental implants as the technology improves. As it is a non-invasive and objective way to evaluate short- and long-term implant viability, RFA is an increasingly utilized method.

== Scientific foundations ==
The method that preceded RFA, percussion or “tapping,” may be used to understand the underlying functionality of RFA devices as the same principles are at work. When an implant was percussed with a blunt instrument, the nature of the sound elicited would qualitatively indicate the level of the implant's stability. A low pitched, dull sound (low frequency) indicated a loose bond with the bone, as the vibrations moved slower across the distance between the implant and surrounding tissue. A high pitched, crystalline sound indicated a tight connection along the implant-bone interface, with vibrations moving quicker across a more restricted area. The dentist would make a qualitative assessment of the level of stability based on the sound heard.

With RFA, vibrations are being used to determine stability, but on a micro scale and in a non-invasive manner. A metal peg (transducer) with a magnet top is attached to the implant. Magnetic pulses (alternating sine waves of uniform amplitude) cause the peg to vibrate, increasing steadily in pitch until the implant resonates. The higher the resonant frequency, the more stable the implant.

== Measurement ==
The frequency readings, translated to an Implant Stability Quotient (ISQ), are used as an assessment and ongoing monitoring tool. Medical interpretations of ISQ values may then be used to inform treatment plans, as analyzed and documented in hundreds of clinical studies.

A reading of 55 or below indicates that too much lateral movement is possible, and the implant needs to reach secondary stability (greater bonding with the bone) before the prosthesis may be attached. If the resonance frequency reading increases, it signals that osseointegration is occurring. Along with other diagnostic tools, measurements over time can be used to indicate the rate of osseointegration, and treatment plans may be assigned accordingly. If the rate is initially low and does not increase, it signals the implant is not viable.
