= Implantation =

Implantation may refer to:

- Implantation (embryology), in which an embryo adheres to the wall of the uterus
- Implant (medicine), insertion of implants
- Endometrial transplantation, as part of the theory of retrograde menstruation in endometriosis
- Ion implantation, insertion of ions, in semiconductor device fabrication
- Implantation bleeding
- Implantation of tooth
- Implantation rate
- Implantation spotting

== See also ==
- Implant (disambiguation)
