= Orthopedic plate =

Device used to hold fractured bones in place

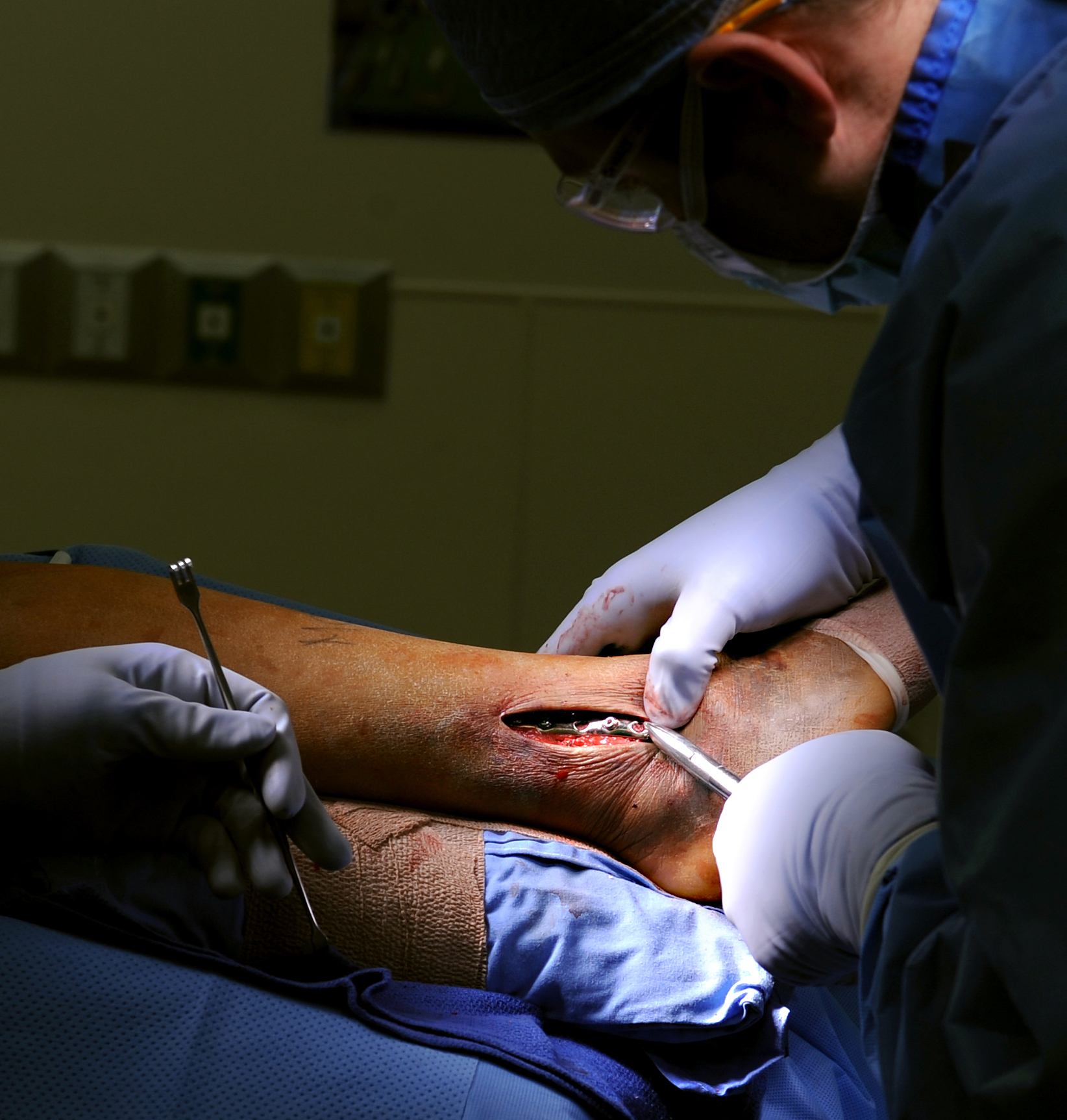
Orthopedic surgeon making adjustments to a metal plate in a patient's ankle

An orthopedic plate is a form of internal fixation used in orthopedic surgery to hold fractures in place to allow bone healing and to reduce the possibility of nonunion. Most modern plates include bone screws to help the orthopedic plate stay in place.

== Historic overview ==
Prior to the invention of the orthopedic plate, metal wiring was used to solve the issue of bone fractures until about 1850. It is debated when the first use of this technique was actually made; some attribute it to the ancient Greeks. Its first recorded use, however, was in 1755 in a French journal. Not until 1870 did a Frenchman, Laurent Berenger-Feraud, write a book on internal fixation and bone fractures called "Traité de l'immobilisation directe des fragments osseux dans les fractures" (A book on direct immobilization of bone fragments of fractures).

However, one thing lacked, the antiseptic treatments needed to properly administer these techniques. Joseph Lister, a British assistant surgeon, in 1877 tried his techniques on a patient and showed huge success. Carl Hausmann is credited with making the first successful plate using both nickel sheets and screws and creating a method of removal without reopening the wound site in 1886. The years following focused on better surgical techniques and experimentation with other materials. Metals were the most common material for orthopedic plates until cytotoxic tests were used to determine biocompatibility of metals put into the patient's body postoperatively.

Modern orthopedic plating did not start until the 1950s, when Maurice Muller and other surgeons formed AO/ASIF (Association for the Study of Internal Fixation) to improve plating techniques. The purpose of the AO were to better understand bone repair, fracture formation and surgical techniques to gain better results in medical applications.

== Materials ==
=== Previously used materials ===
- Gold
- Ivory horn
- Nickel
- Magnesium
- Copper alloys
- Zinc alloys
- Silver
- Lead

=== Current materials ===
- Titanium
- Medical grade steel
- Cobalt-based alloys
- Bioceramics
- Metal composites
- Polymers

== Classifications of orthopedic plates by usage ==
Orthopedic plates are designed based on the bone fracture. While the general design is similar, each plate must be manufactured to not only to reduce the fracture but also fit the contour of the patient's bone.

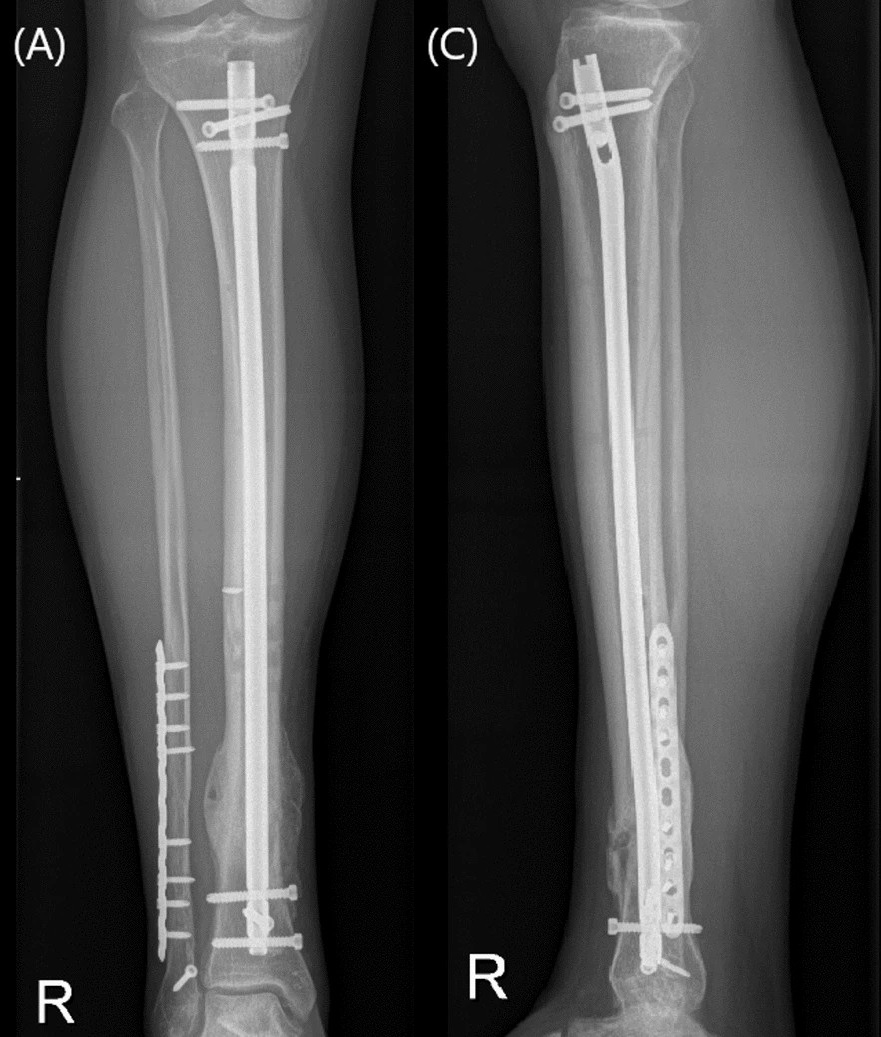
X-ray showing a fractured tibia with an intramedullary nail and fibula with plate fixation

=== Protection ===
Locking plates can be used either to support a locking head screw, or to force bone together at the fracture. Locking head screws can be applied at the fracture, with the orthopedic plate in place to reduce applied force on the bone fracture.

=== Tension and Compression ===
Compression plates can be implanted in such a way that it is in tension, forcing the bone together at the fracture. The use of an articulated tension device can also be used to compress the bone together by pulling the compression plate.

=== Bridging ===
For fragmentary bone fractures, bridging plates can be used to hold the bone in place when there are no anchor points at the fracture point. Bridging can allow for relative stability along the bone, while not disturbing the bone fragments.

=== Buttress ===
Buttress plates, or concave plates, are useful for fractures along concave surfaces. Due to the angle of the bone, the contour of the concave plate aligns with the bone, providing even compressive force along the fracture.

== Applications ==
=== Different plate types ===
1969	Dynamic compression plate (DCP)
1990	Limited-contact dynamic compression plate (LC-DCP)
1994	Less-invasive stabilization system (LISS)
2001	Locking Compression Plate (LCP)

== Modes of use ==
- Buttress
- Neutralization
- Bridging
- Tension
- Compression

== See also ==
- List of orthopedic implants
