= Per-Ingvar Brånemark =

Swedish anatomist (1929–2014)

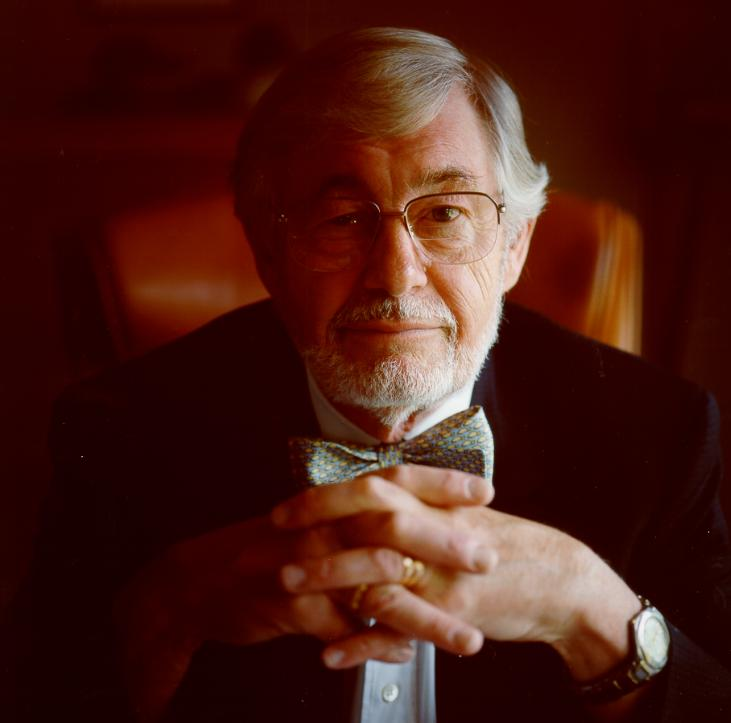
- Born: 3 May 1929; Karlshamn, Sweden
- Died: 20 December 2014 (aged 85); Gothenburg, Sweden
- Education: Lund University
- Known for: Osseointegration research
- Awards: European Inventor Award 2011
- Scientific career
- Fields: Orthopedic surgery
- Workplaces: University of Gothenburg

Per-Ingvar Brånemark (3 May 1929 – 20 December 2014) was a Swedish physician and researcher, known as the "father of modern dental implantology". The Brånemark Osseointegration Center (BOC), named after its founder, was founded in 1989 in Gothenburg, Sweden.

== Biography ==
After studying at Lund University in Sweden, Brånemark became professor of Anatomy at University of Gothenburg in 1969.

Brånemark has been awarded many prizes for his work, including the coveted Swedish Society of Medicine's Söderberg Prize in 1992—often referred to as the 'mini-Nobel'—and the Swedish Engineering Academy's equally prestigious medal for technical innovation.

Brånemark has also been honored with the Harvard School of Dental Medicine Medal for his work on dental implants in the United States and holds more than 30 honorary positions throughout Europe and North America, including the Honorary Fellowship of the Royal Society of Medicine in the UK. In 2003, he received an honorary doctorate from the European University of Madrid. He was the winner of the European Inventor Award 2011 in the category Lifetime achievement. In 2014, he died at the age of 85.

== Dental implantology ==
In 1978, the first Dental Implant Consensus Conference was held, sponsored jointly by the National Institutes of Health and Harvard University. It was a landmark event, at which retrospective data on dental implants were collected and analyzed and criteria and standards for implant dentistry were established.

In 1982 in Toronto, Brånemark presented work that had begun 15 years earlier in Gothenburg. Brånemark's investigations into the phenomenon of osseointegration, or the biological fusion of bone to a foreign material, reinvigorated the field of implantology. The Toronto conference brought widespread recognition to the Brånemark implant methods and materials and is one of the most significant scientific breakthroughs in dentistry since the late 1970s.

The Brånemark System of dental implants was bought out and is currently available from Nobel Biocare.

=== Work on osseointegration ===
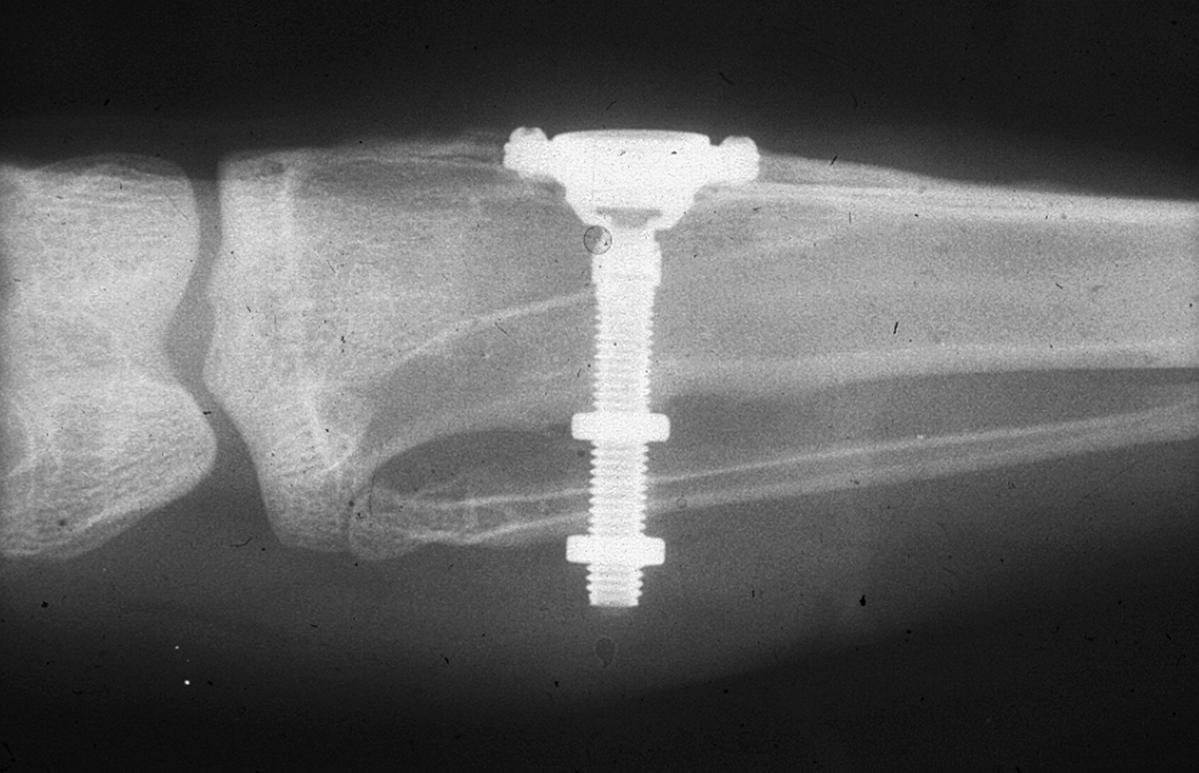
Radiograph of Brånemark's initial rabbit specimen, showing the titanium optic chamber fixed to the rabbit's tibia and fibula. The distal extent of the rabbit's femur can be seen at the left of the radiograph, completely unrelated to the screw, despite some sources (such as Block & Kent's textbook) claiming that Brånemark's study involved the femur.

Brånemark's work in the field of osseointegration reinvigorated the realm of implant dentistry and brought it from being a shunned field into one that became recognized and incorporated into dental school curricula and training programs.

Early modern dental implant technology consisted of blade and transosteal implants. Blade implants, introduced in 1967, consisted of a metal blade that was placed within a bony incision that subsequently healed over the horizontally situated piece of metal but allowed a vertical segment to perforate the healed surface. Transosteal implants, the application of which was strictly limited to the mandible, consisted of a number of screws which were inserted into the inferior aspect of the mandible, some of which extended through and through into the oral cavity.

It was previously thought that both of these implant types relied on mechanical retention, as it was heretofore unknown that metal could be fused into the bone. With the advent of the current understanding of osseointegration, however, rootform endosteal implants became the new standard in implant technology.

The phenomenon of osseointegration was first described by Bothe et al. in 1940 and later by Leventhal et al. in 1951. Brånemark's studies, and his subsequent coining of the term osseointegration, occurred a year after Leventhal's work during vital microscopy studies in rabbits using titanium optic chambers. He and his team found that titanium oculars placed into the lower leg bones of rabbits could not be removed from the bones after a period of healing (see photo at right). He then developed and tested a type of dental implant utilizing pure titanium screws, which he termed fixtures.

Although the field of implantology was eschewed by dental academia until that time, the "extensive and weighty documentation of implant efficacy and safety" and "early replication by reliable, independent researchers" resulted in the widespread embrace of implantology by the dental community.

Brånemark's son, Rickard, has taken this success and is developing orthopedic prostheses in the form of artificial arms and legs anchored to the human skeleton.

Gösta Larsson (1931–2006) was the first recipient ever of a modern dental implant, which occurred in 1965. Brånemark, by then Professor of Anatomy at University of Gothenburg in Sweden, placed the first titanium dental implant into a human volunteer. Larsson, a Swede who was edentulous (toothless) at the time and had been born with severe chin and jaw deformities, agreed to the test because he wanted to have teeth again. He died in 2006, having used his implants for over 40 years.

== See also ==
- Osseoincorporation
