= Osstell AB =

Swedish medical technology company

- Company type: Private
- Industry: Medical devices
- Founded: 1999
- Headquarters: Gothenburg, Sweden
- Area served: Worldwide
- Products: Dental implant stability measuring devices (e.g. Osstell Beacon, SmartPeg)
- Production output: Kungsbacka and Vänersborg, Sweden

Osstell AB is a company headquartered in Gothenburg, Sweden that develops, manufactures, and sells devices and accessories used to measure dental implant stability. It was founded in 1999 with the aim of developing and commercializing a device that utilized resonance frequency analysis (RFA) to determine the level of stability of a dental implant.

== Patented technology ==
In a dental implant procedure, a hole is drilled into the jawbone and a titanium implant is inserted. If and when the implant has proven to be stable in the jawbone, a prosthetic tooth is then affixed to the implant.

Osstell's patented RFA device (the most recent generation called Osstell Beacon) helps dentists assess the stability of the implant, without having to physically disturb it. A small aluminum rod, called a SmartPeg, is placed in the implant. The RFA device prompts vibration in the rod by initiating magnetic pulses of varying frequencies. The RFA device detects the resonance frequency of the rod (called SmartPeg) while attached to the implant. The resonance frequency is converted to a numeric scale from 1 to 99, with higher numbers indicating higher stability.

This scale, called the Implant Stability Quotient (ISQ), corresponds with the kHz frequency range of 3500–8500 kHz. The ISQ scale was developed by Osstell in order to give an immediately comprehensible indicator of implant stability and is now the global standard for implant stability measurement.

The instruments are manufactured in factories in Kungsbacka and Vänersborg, Sweden.
