= European Association for Osseointegration =

EAO asbl, operating as the European Association for Osseointegration (EAO) is a non-profit organisation founded in Munich in 1991 (35 years ago) to serve as an international, interdisciplinary and independent science-based forum for all professionals interested in the art and science of Osseointegration.

Its headquarters are in Ixelles, Brussels, Belgium.

== See also ==
- Osseointegration
