= Munjed Al Muderis =

Australian surgeon and author (born 1972)

- Born: 25 June 1972 (age 54)
- Education: University of Baghdad
- Occupations: Orthopaedic surgeon, adjunct clinical professor, clinical lecturer
- Organization: Osseointegration Group of Australia

Munjed Al Muderis (born 25 June 1972) is an Australian adjunct clinical professor in orthopaedic surgery, author and human rights activist. He has done pioneering work on prosthetics, especially on titanium devices.

Al Muderis was born in Iraq to a wealthy family and became a surgeon under the regime of Saddam Hussein. He was a medical student in Basra at the start of the Gulf War in August 1990. As a junior surgeon, he emigrated from Iraq to Australia. He travelled through Indonesia and Malaysia and reached Australia where he was kept in at an immigration detention centre near Derby, Western Australia. He was released after 10 months and carried on his career in medicine, eventually specialising in osseointegration surgery.

An investigation by Nine Entertainment found that the possibility of risks to his patients were minimised when their operations were explained to them, complications were ignored and some patients were left unable to walk or mutilated. Al Muderis unsuccessfully sued Nine Entertainment for defamation.

Al Muderis wrote the book Walking Free on his experiences in Iraq, in the Australian immigration detention system, and on his career in Australia.

== Early life ==
Al Muderis was born under the regime of Saddam Hussein in Iraq. His father was a former judge of the Supreme Court of Iraq and had authority in the Marine Corps, while his uncle was a descendant of the second royal family and Prime Minister, when Iraq was still a kingdom. His mother was a school principal who had been demoted for refusing to join the Ba'ath Party.

Al Muderis graduated from Baghdad College High School in 1991, where he was a classmate of Qusay Hussein. He went on to study medicine at various universities, including the Baghdad University from 1991 to 1997, graduating with a Bachelor of Medicine, Bachelor of Surgery.

In 1999, he was forced to flee Iraq when he was working as a junior surgeon at Saddam Hussein Medical Centre in Baghdad. A busload of army draft evaders were brought into the hospital for the top of their ears to be amputated under Saddam's orders. The senior surgeon in the operating theatre refused the orders and was immediately interrogated and shot in front of several medical staff. Instead of complying with the orders, Al Muderis decided to flee. He escaped the operating theatre and hid in the female toilets for five hours. Shortly after, he fled to Jordan before the authorities caught up with him and moved on to Kuala Lumpur. From there, he took a people-smuggling route to Christmas Island, where he was sent to the Curtin Immigration Reception and Processing Centre. He was detained there until his identity was verified, given the number 982. He was punished with solitary confinement and was repeatedly told to go back where he came from after fellow detainees who caused riots blamed him. Ten months after being sent to the detention centre, he was granted refugee status and freed.

== Osseointegration ==
Al Muderis developed a new form of implant, osseointegration prosthetic limb, which addressed several issues previously faced by patients. Orthopedics This Week has described Al Muderis as "The Most Incredible Orthopedist You'll Ever Read About". News Corp Australia and The Australian Women's Weekly have ranked Al Muderis as one of the world's top osseointegration surgeons.

Traditional and rigid socket based technology in some cases can be replaced with surgery that inserts a titanium implant into the bone. Osseoperception may occurs as the prosthetic is anchored directly to the bone allowing some patients to recover some amount of feeling. The implant's surface is made of highly porous titanium allowing for ingrowth of bone. An adaptor is designed with a smooth surface to minimise friction and coated with titanium niobium for antibacterial purposes. The adaptor is fixed to a control device and is connected to the exterior of the prosthetic limb. Putting on and taking off the limb can be done in less than ten seconds. Osseointegration surgery aims to provide amputees with greater mobility and reduced discomfort.

== Career ==
Al Muderis was a first year resident at Saddam Hussein Medical Centre in Baghdad before he fled Iraq and his career was disrupted.

In 2004, he joined the Australian Orthopaedic Training Program. In 2008, he attained his surgical fellowship, FRACS (Orth).

Al Muderis chaired the 2015 Osseointegration Conference and was a guest speaker at Australian Orthotic Prosthetist Association Meeting.

Al Muderis has been recognised by Queen Elizabeth II for his work with British soldier Michael Swain. He was invited by Queen Elizabeth II to attend the ceremony in which Swain received his MBE medal.

Prince Harry visited Al Muderis on 7 May 2015 to follow up on Al Muderis' work and meet some of the amputees he has helped, including a decorated British soldier who lost his legs in Afghanistan who was undergoing groundbreaking treatment to fit prosthetic legs at Macquarie University Hospital.

Al Muderis has connected prosthetic limbs to dozens of UK soldiers.

The UK Ministry of Defence (MoD) is spending £2m on trials that were to begin in 2016 and involve 20 amputees who were to undergo Al Muderis' osseointegration procedure. Al Muderis has trained five British surgeons and they were to perform the surgeries together, then monitor those 20 cases for two years. A similar project was in the works for Canada and Houston, Texas.

Al Muderis has presented and published numerous research reports on osseointegration surgery for amputees, how to measure growth rate in children, limited incision plating technique in management of clavicle fracture and describing new patterns of distal clavicle fractures dislocation.

Al Muderis was nominated for 2020 NSW Australian of the Year award for his humanitarian work and contribution to medicine.

== Controversy ==
Al Muderis has been the subject of a number of claims.

In 2016, a patient suggested Al Muderis had not appropriately obtained consent from a patient for a procedure to be performed on his behalf by a trainee doctor and robot. A complaint made to the New South Wales Healthcare Complaints Commission was dismissed in March 2018.

In 2017, Justice Stephen Rothman awarded Al Muderis $480,000 for "a most vicious and vituperative series of publications" that "vilified" Al Muderis after an online campaign by a patient who ignored post-operative advice.

In 2022, a joint investigation by The Age, The Sydney Morning Herald and 60 Minutes (all divisions of Nine Entertainment) alleged there were serious questions around Al Muderis's approach to patient selection and aftercare. Four patients described experiences ranging from life-changing to life-destroying. It was suggested that risks were minimised when their operations were explained to them, complications ignored and patients left unable to walk or mutilated.

Subsequently, a concerns notice was issued by lawyers for Al Muderis to Nine Publications, 60 Minutes, The Sydney Morning Herald and The Age newspapers, to commence defamation proceedings. Over 60 allegations were detailed in the 41-page notice. Nine and Fairfax failed to respond to the concerns notice, within the 28 days' notice period. On 31 October 2022, Al Muderis issued defamation proceedings against Channel Nine, Fairfax Publications and the Age company in the Federal Court of Australia.

In October 2022, in the wake of claims made by Nine and Fairfax, Al Muderis' insurer, Avant, took steps to withhold his indemnity insurance, thereby limiting his ability to undertake surgery. This decision was very rapidly reversed following publication of an open letter of support for Al Muderis signed by more than 1500 former and current patients and colleagues. The decision by Avant to withdraw insurance cover was also criticised as deeply worrying, undertaken as it was in response to unfounded allegations in the popular media and in the absence of any regulatory involvement.

Al Muderis' defamation case was dismissed by the Federal Court in August 2025, with Justice Abraham finding that the claims made by the Nine Network were based in contextual truth and were broadcast in the public interest. Justice Abraham commented that "the positive media coverage his practice had enjoyed needed correcting" after hearing accounts from over three-dozen former patients during the proceedings.

== Humanitarian work ==
=== Beyond the Boats ===
Al Muderis was involved in a high-level round table on asylum and refugee policy held on 11 July 2014 at Parliament House which led to the asylum and refugee policy report "Beyond The Boats: building an asylum and refugee policy for the long term". He related his own experience as a refugee to discussions about a new approach to asylum seeker policy.

=== Amnesty International ===
Al Muderis has campaigned for Amnesty International, including leading a human rights lecture called "Human Rights Lecture 2015: Dr Munjed Al Muderis" in Smithfield, Queensland.

=== Red Cross ===
Al Muderis in 2015 became an Australian ambassador for the Red Cross. He has spoken out about the misconceptions around seeking asylum in Australia and joined a panel at a live screening for the SBS program Go Back To Where You Came From in the hopes of building a more compassionate and caring community.

=== Iraq ===
According to the Australian of the Year Awards,

Funded out of his own pocket, [Al Muderis] has taken a team to his former homeland of Iraq seven times, to help the victims of the conflict he fled, and has educated other orthopaedic surgeons in the osseointegration technique and in complex limb reconstruction.

In 2023, Al Muderis returned to Iraq and saw over 150 patients.

=== Unbroken ===
In February 2023, Al Muderis was made an ambassador to the "Unbroken" project in Ukraine after leading a team of Australian doctors who performed more than 20 extremely complex limb reconstructions and prosthetics operations at the hospital of the First Medical Association of Lviv.

=== Other ===
He is a patron of the Asylum Seekers Centre, a not-for-profit that provides personal and practical support to people seeking asylum in Australia.

Al Muderis visited patients at the Children's Surgical Centre in Cambodia on 20 September 2015 to provide their patients with osseointegration procedures.

== Personal life ==
Al Muderis has two sons and two daughters from previous relationships.

== Books ==
=== Walking Free ===
Walking Free was published in October 2014, written by Al Muderis and contributed to by Patrick Weaver. It was published by Allen & Unwin. In his book, he shared his life and experience in Iraq under Saddam Hussein's regime, his journey to seek asylum in Australia and how he worked towards being a world leader in osseointegration surgery.

=== Going Back ===
His second memoir, Going Back, was published in 2019 by Allen & Unwin. The book describes his return to Iraq after eighteen years, at the invitation of the Iraqi government, to operate on soldiers, police and civilian amputees wounded in the war against ISIS.

=== Munjed al Muderis: From refugee to surgical inventor ===
In 2020, as part of a series of children's books – Aussie STEM Stars – about some of Australia's top scientists and inventors chosen on the basis of their pioneering work, a book about Al Muderis was written by Dianne Wolfer.
