= Ostel (Berlin) =

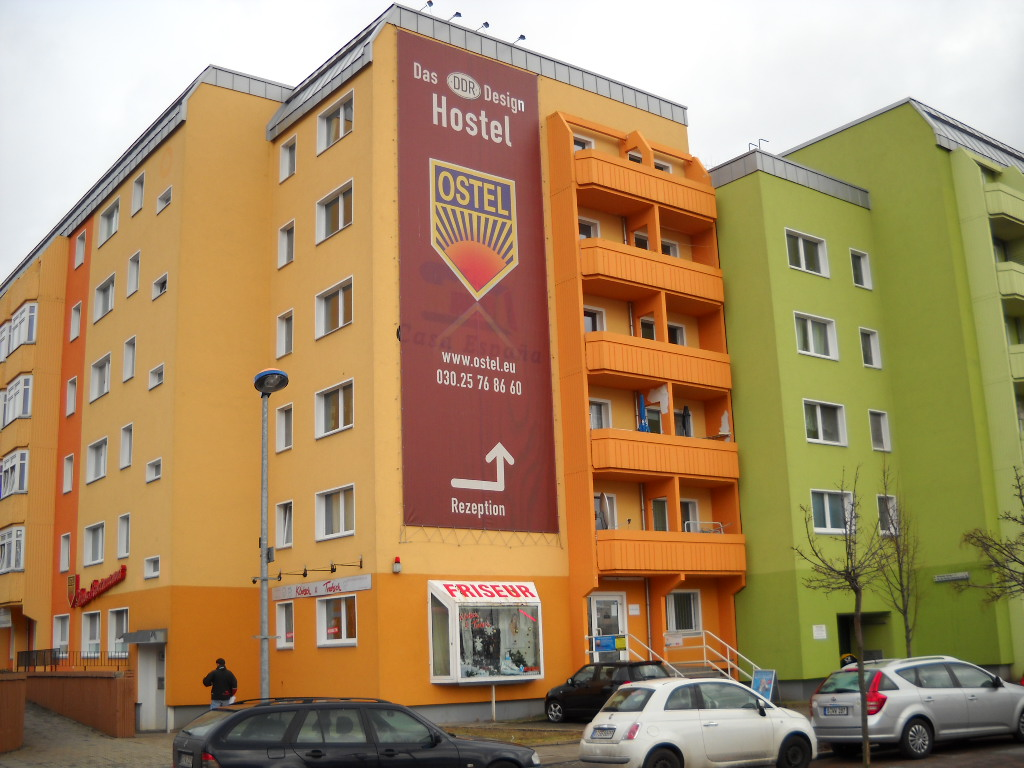
- Ostel building in February 2012
- Interactive map of the Ostel area

General information
- Location: Berlin, Germany
- Inaugurated: 1 May 2007

Ostel was a hostel in Berlin. Located in an original Plattenbau, it was decorated in the style of Ostalgie. Sometime in 2020, it has closed down.

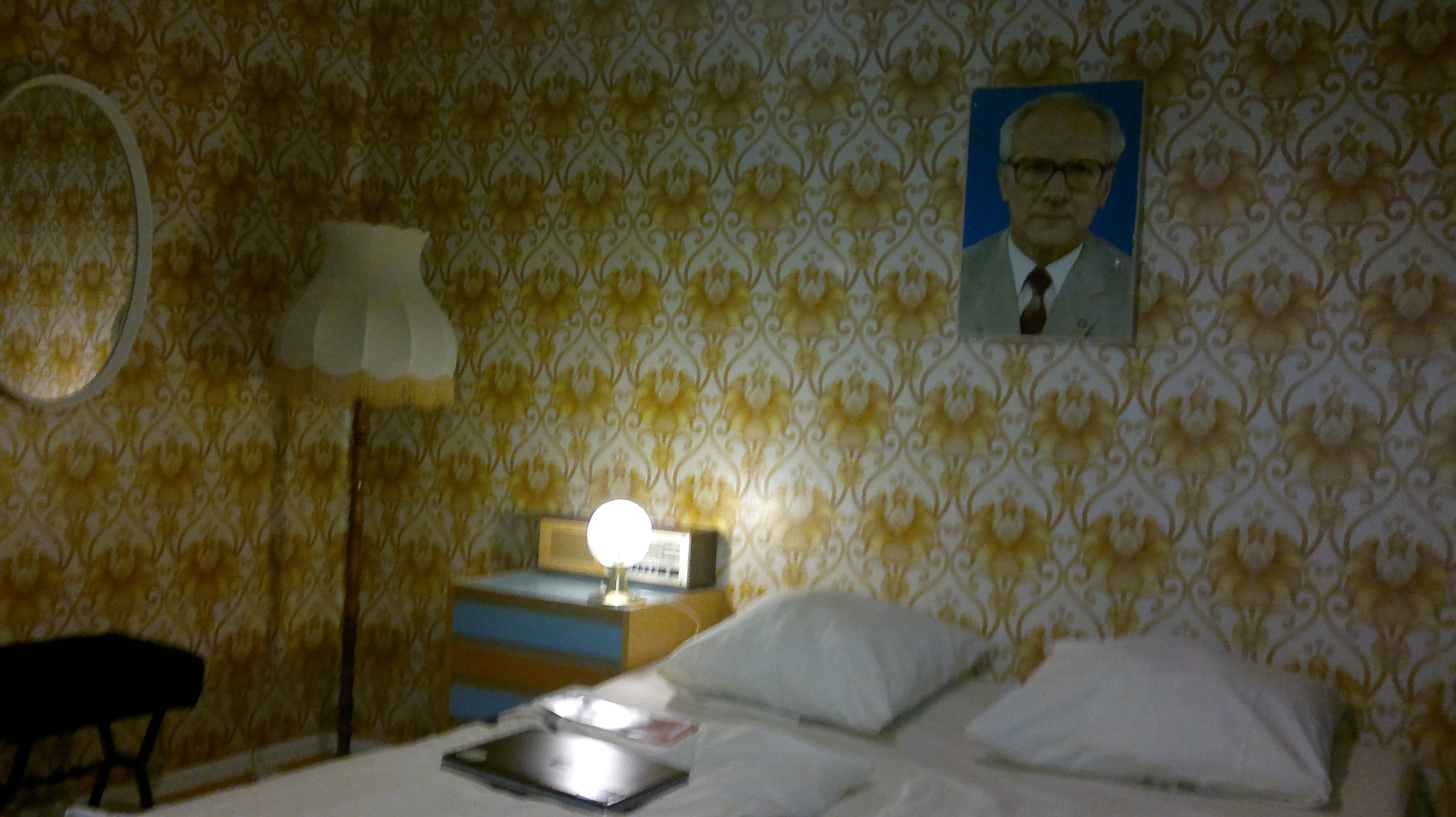
Ostel room with an Erich Honecker photograph hanging at the wall.

It was inaugurated on 1 May 2007, and is decorated in the style of East Germany. Clocks display the time in Moscow, Beijing and Havana and the rooms are decorated with photographs of Erich Honecker.
