= Industrial Skills Qualification =

Industrial Skills Qualification (ISQ) is a post-secondary vocational qualification in Brunei. It is a Level 2 qualification in the country's national qualifications framework and in the same level as the academic O Level qualification. ISQ was introduced in 2013 and is awarded in the Institute of Brunei Technical Education; entry into ISQ programmes is for Year 9 leavers in the current education system, the 21st Century National Education System (Malay: Sistem Pendidikan Negara Abad Ke-21) or commonly known as SPN21, or Form Three leavers in pre-SPN21.
