= Internal fixation =

Orthopedic operation to fix bone

Tantalum plates and screws
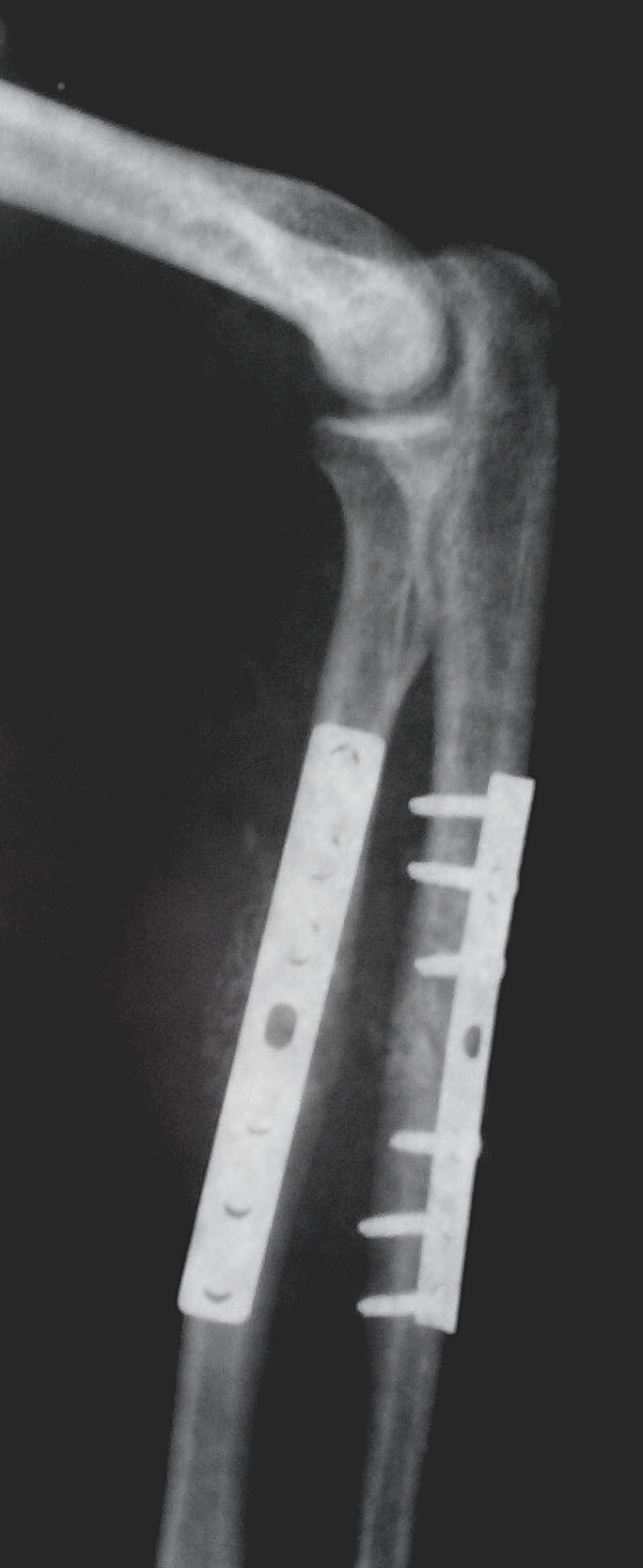
- Metallic implants to repair fractures to the radius and ulna, note the visible break in the ulna (right forearm)

Internal fixation is an operation in orthopedics that involves the surgical implementation of implants for the purpose of repairing a bone, a concept that dates to the mid-nineteenth century and was made applicable for routine treatment in the mid-twentieth century. An internal fixator may be made of stainless steel, titanium alloy, or cobalt-chrome alloy.

Types of internal fixators include:

- Plate and screws
- Kirschner wires
- Intramedullary nails
- Herbert screws

== Open reduction ==
Open reduction internal fixation (ORIF) involves the implementation of implants to guide the healing process of a bone, as well as the open reduction, or setting, of the bone. Open reduction refers to open surgery to set bones, as is necessary for some fractures. Internal fixation refers to fixation of screws and/or plates, intramedullary rods and other devices to enable or facilitate healing. Rigid fixation prevents micro-motion across lines of fracture to enable healing and prevent infection, which happens when implants such as plates (e.g. dynamic compression plate) are used. ORIF techniques often are used in cases involving serious fractures such as comminuted or displaced fractures or, in cases where the bone otherwise would not heal correctly with casting or splinting alone.

Risks and complications may include bacterial colonization of the bone, infection, stiffness and loss of range of motion, non-union, mal-union, damage to the muscles, nerve damage and palsy, arthritis, tendonitis, chronic pain associated with plates, screws, and pins, compartment syndrome, deformity, audible popping and snapping, and possible future surgeries to remove the hardware.

== Closed reduction ==
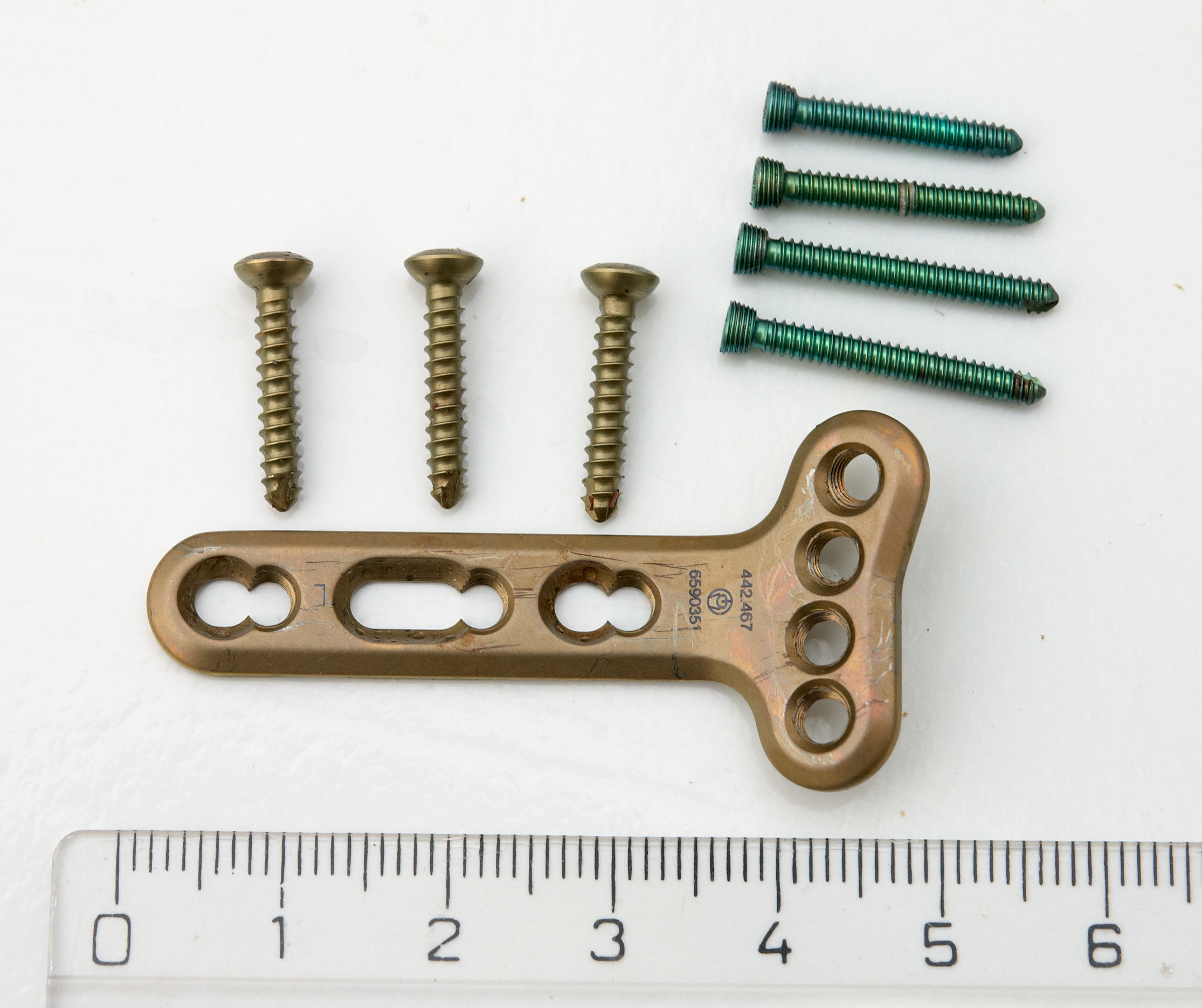
Implant that has been used for fixation of a broken wrist

Closed reduction internal fixation (CRIF) is reduction without any open surgery, followed by internal fixation. It appears to be an acceptable alternative in unstable distressed lateral condylar fractures of the humerus in children, but if fracture displacement after closed reduction exceeds 2 mm, open reduction and internal fixation is recommended.

Various techniques of minimally invasive surgery for internal fixation of bones have been reported. The treatment of fractures of the distal third of the tibia has evolved with the development of improved imaging and surgical techniques.

=== Internal fixation implants for intracapsular hip fractures in older adults ===
The latest evidence suggests that there may be little or no difference between screws and fixed angle plates as internal fixation implants for intracapsular hip fractures in older adults. The findings are based on low quality evidence that cannot firmly conclude major difference in hip function, quality of life, and additional surgery.

== Additional images ==
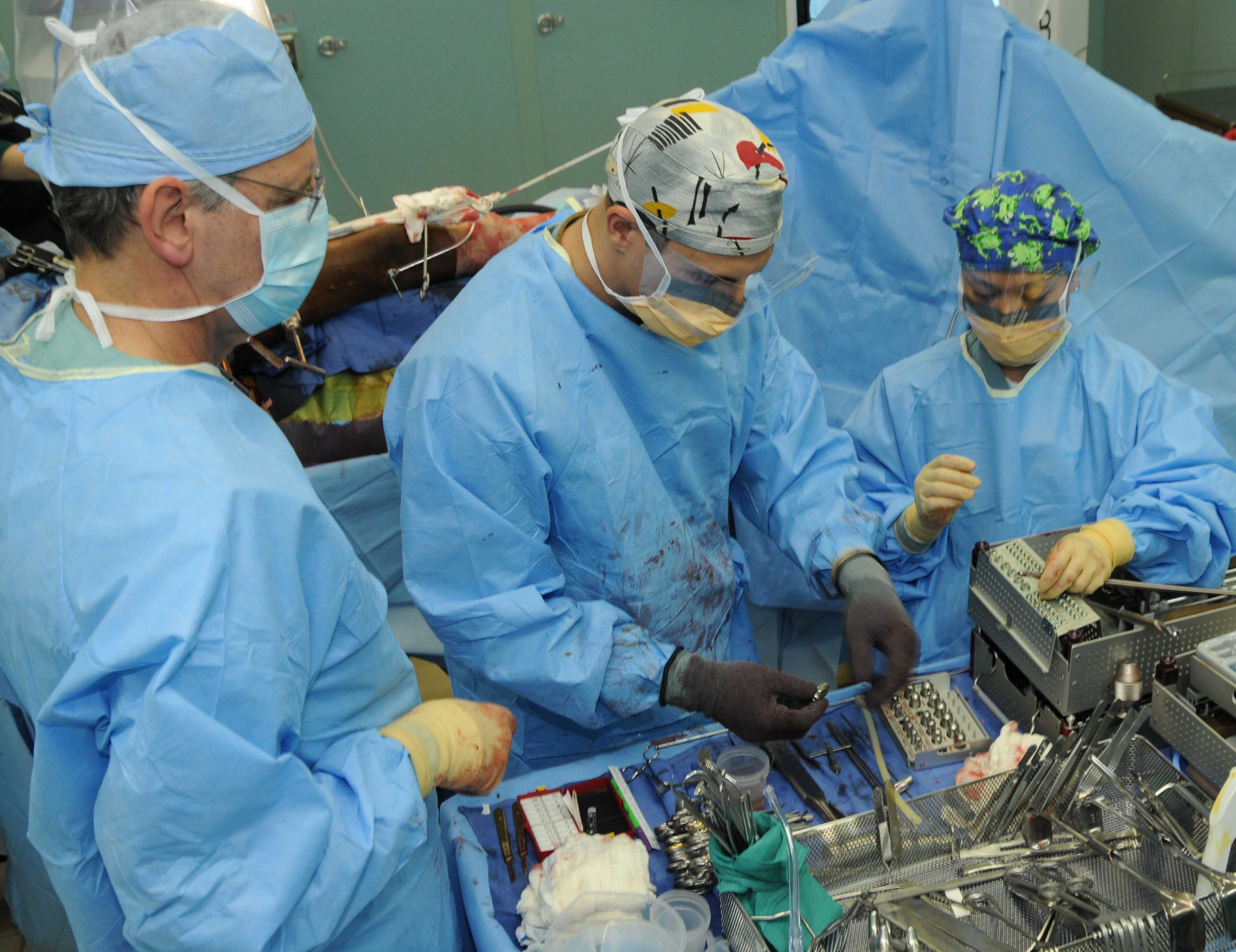
US Navy physicians perform an open reduction internal fixation operation on the femur.

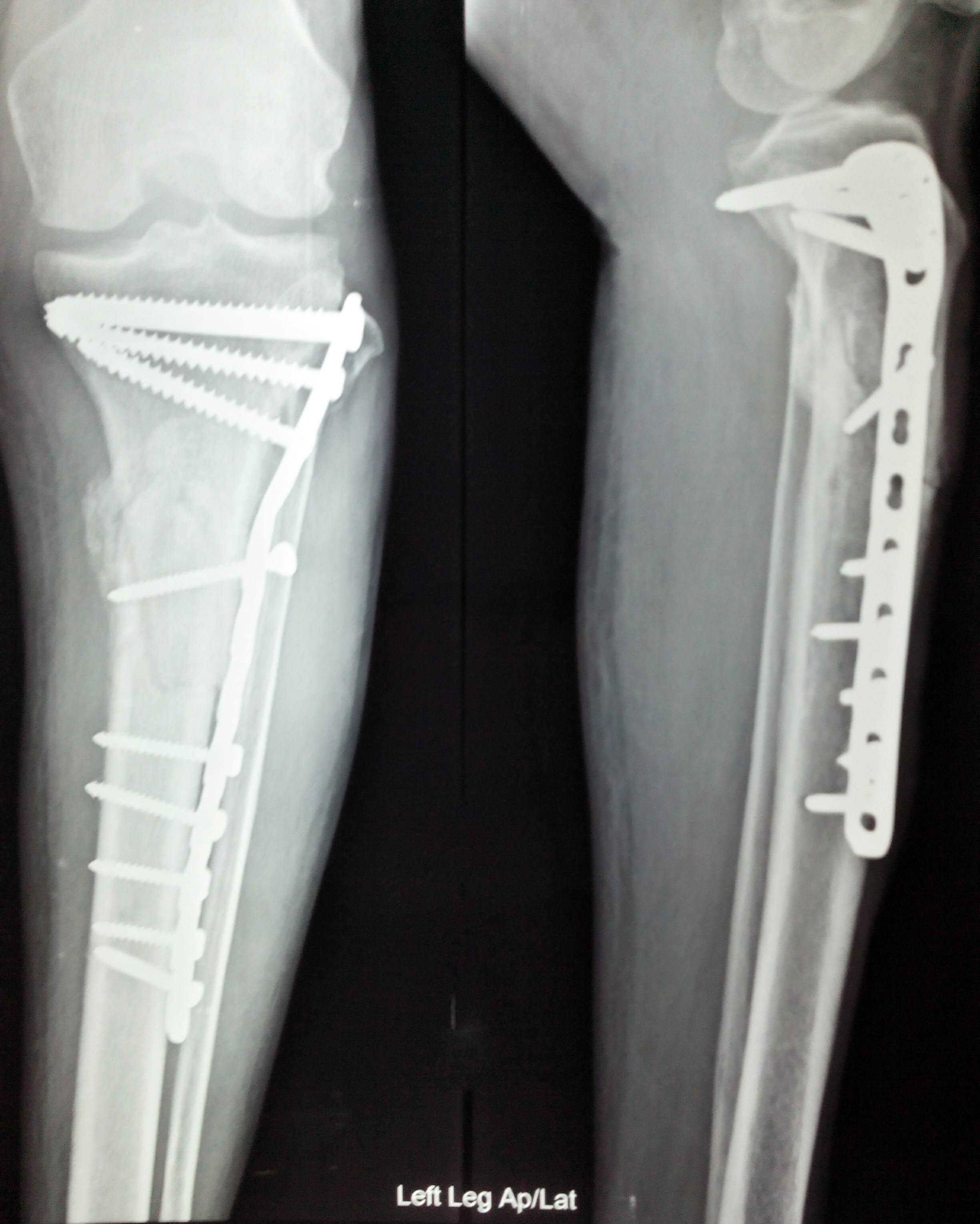
Anterior and lateral view x-rays of fractured left leg with internal fixation

== See also ==
- Arbeitsgemeinschaft für Osteosynthesefragen
- Carbon nanotubes in medicine § CNT network bio-stress sensors
- External fixation
- Bone fracture
- Trauma surgery
- List of orthopedic implants
- Osseoincorporation
- Osseointegration
