= Osseoincorporation =

Osseoincorporation is the healing potential of bone onto an implant surface and into an implant structure. Three-dimensional, porous implantable materials used in the orthopedic and dental implant industries offer the potential for ingrowth as well as ongrowth or osseoincorporation.

== Comparison to osseointegration ==
Conventional textured or coated implant surfaces are designed to achieve bone-to-implant contact, which is called ongrowth. Per-Ingvar Brånemark defined this ongrowth phenomenon, osseointegration, as "the direct structural and functional connection between ordered, living bone and the surface of a load-carrying implant". In the case of dental implants, they osseointegrate. Porous implantable materials are designed for bone to grow not only onto the material but also into its pores, and in some cases interconnecting within the material’s structure, in a process called osseoincorporation.

== Complications ==
In some cases, the patient has periodontal defects (damaged or poor bone structure) which hinder osseointegration. Guided tissue and/or bone regeneration may be necessary before the bone can osseointegrate with the dental implant. In this case a combination of barrier membranes, bone tacks, and supplemental autogenous bone may be required to promote proper osseointegration. In addition, implant surface modification has been studied and now integrated, thus promoting an optimal tissue-implant interface (i.e. osseointegration, implant-gingival seal).

== See also ==
- Osseointegration
