= Implant stability quotient =

The implant stability quotient (ISQ) is the value on a scale that indicates the level of stability and osseointegration in dental implants. The scale ranges from 1 to 100, with higher values indicating greater stability. The acceptable stability range lies between 55 and 85 ISQ. ISQ values are obtained using resonance frequency analysis (RFA).

Higher values are generally found in the mandible than the maxilla. High initial stability (ISQ values of 70 and above) tends to not increase with time, even if the high mechanical stability will decrease to be replaced by a developed biological stability. Lower initial stability will normally increase with time due to the lower mechanical stability being enforced by the bone remodeling process (osseointegration). The overall average ISQ value of all implants over time is approximately 70. If the initial ISQ value is high, a small drop in stability normally levels out with time. A significant decrease in ISQ indicates a potential problem and should be considered an early warning.
