= Macquarie University Hospital =

Coordinates: 33.773525°S 151.117871°E

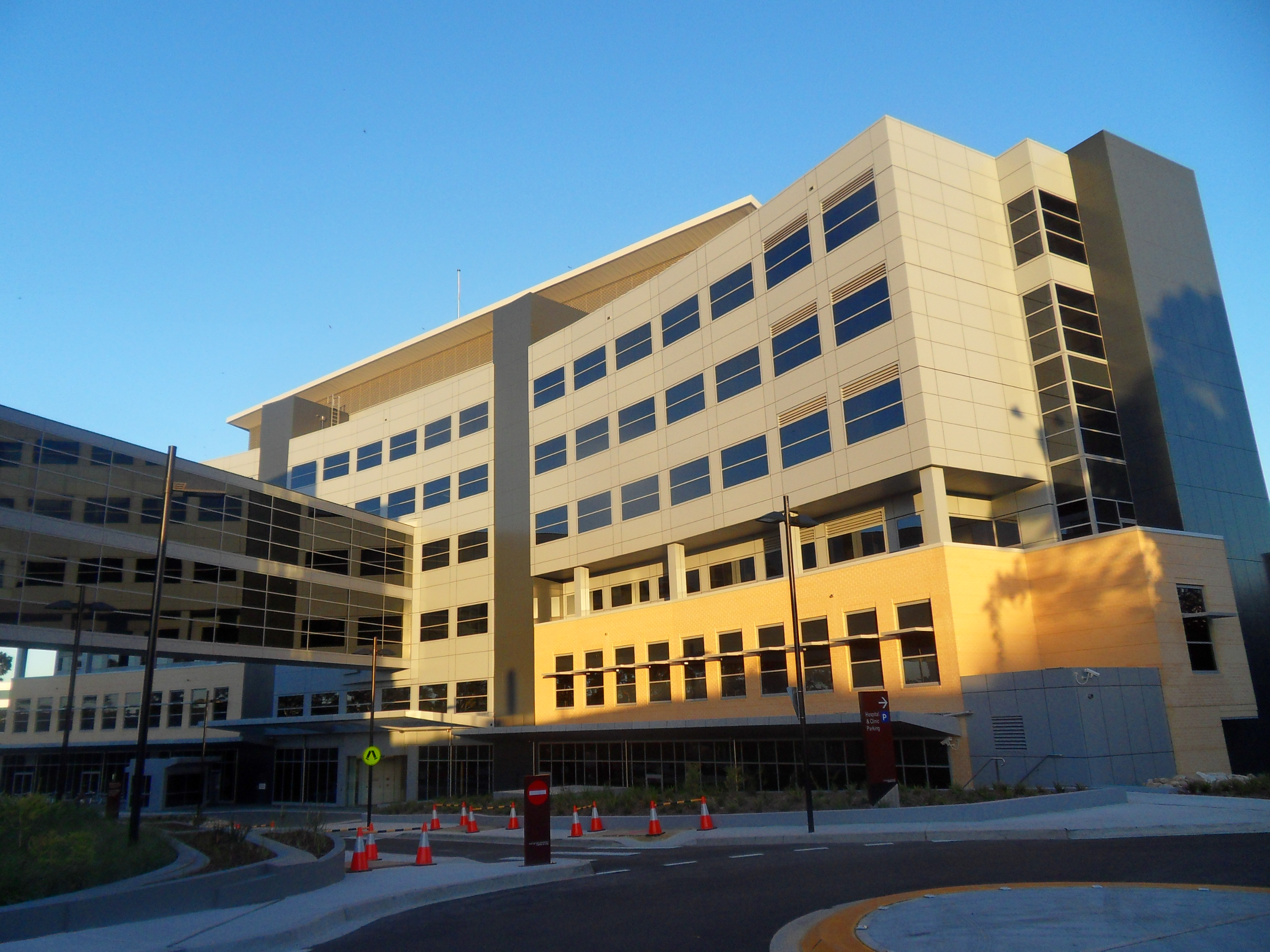
- Macquarie University Hospital

Geography
- Location: Macquarie Park, Sydney, New South Wales, Australia

Organisation
- Affiliated university: Macquarie University

Services
- Emergency department: No
- Beds: 144

Helipads
- Helipad: ICAO: YXUH

History
- Founded: 2010

Links
- Website: www.muh.org.au
- Lists: Hospitals in Australia

The Macquarie University Hospital (abbreviated MUH) is a private teaching hospital owned by Macquarie University.

The hospital is located within Macquarie University and is the first private hospital to be located on a university campus in Australia. The hospital is located near Macquarie University railway station and is also within the university's Research Park. Construction costs for the hospital were over $200 million including fit-out costs. The hospital comprises 144 beds, 14 operating theatres, and is staffed by over 200 surgeons and medical specialists. It has an imaging centre (MMI imaging) and a radiation oncology unit (Genesis Cancer Care).

There are no emergency services at Macquarie University Hospital. The nearest emergency departments are at Ryde Hospital, Concord Hospital, or Royal North Shore Hospital.

== Clinical services ==
The hospital provides inpatient and outpatient services and complements Macquarie University's existing specialisations including cognitive neuropsychology, telemedicine, teleradiology, speech therapy and audiology. It is a fully digitally integrated hospital. It has Australia's first Gamma Knife for advanced radiation therapy, and a cyclotron for the production of radioactive isotopes for medical imaging.

Adjacent to the hospital is the Macquarie University Clinic. The Clinic building is also home to the university's Faculty of Medicine and Health Sciences. The five-storey research and clinic building is linked to the hospital proper by an air bridge.

== See also ==
- Healthcare in Australia
- Lists of hospitals
- List of hospitals in Australia
