= Dental implant =

Surgical component that interfaces with the bone of the jaw

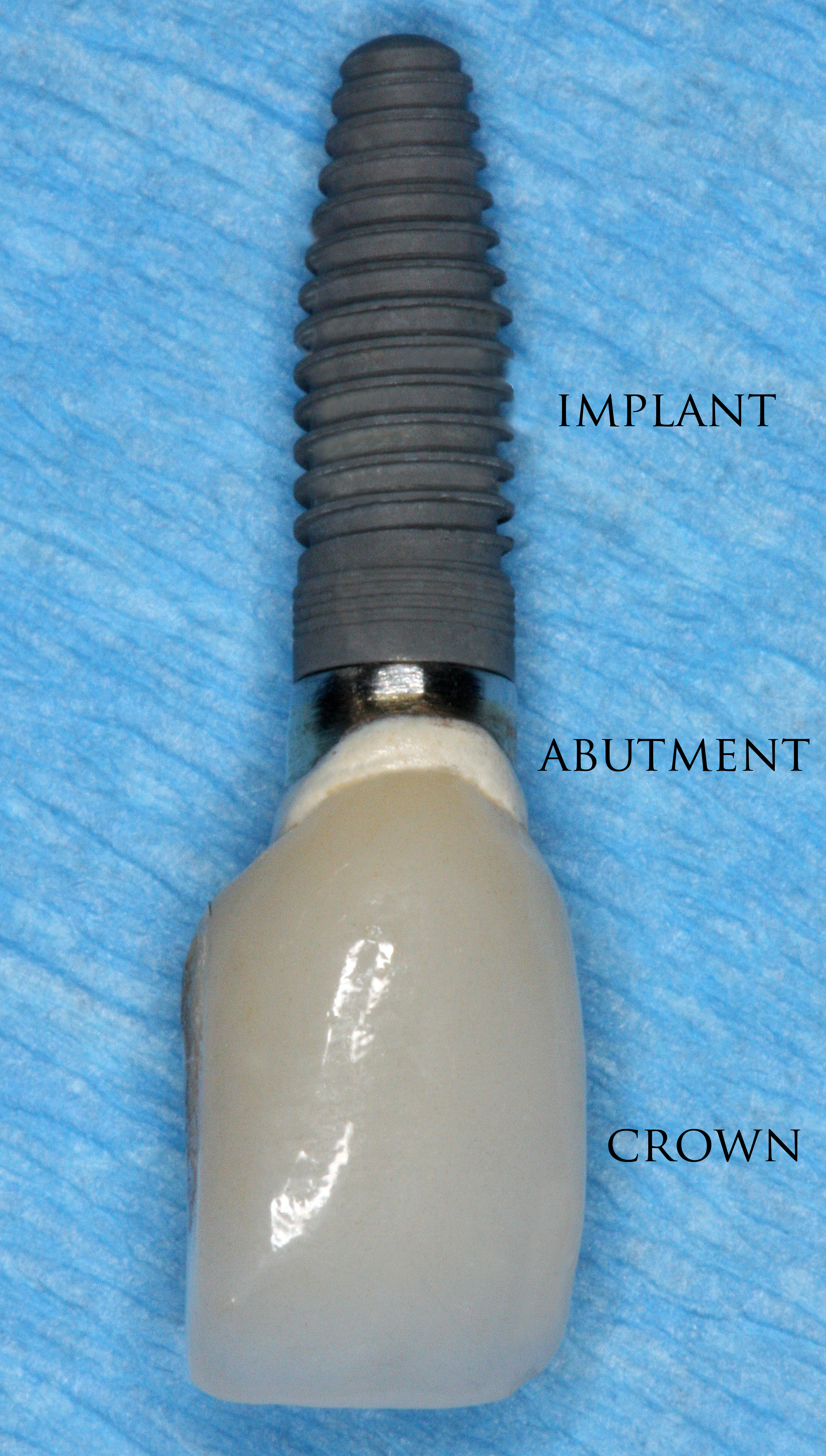
- A titanium dental implant with a crown attached used for a single tooth replacement
- ICD-9-CM: 23.5-23.6
- MeSH: D003757

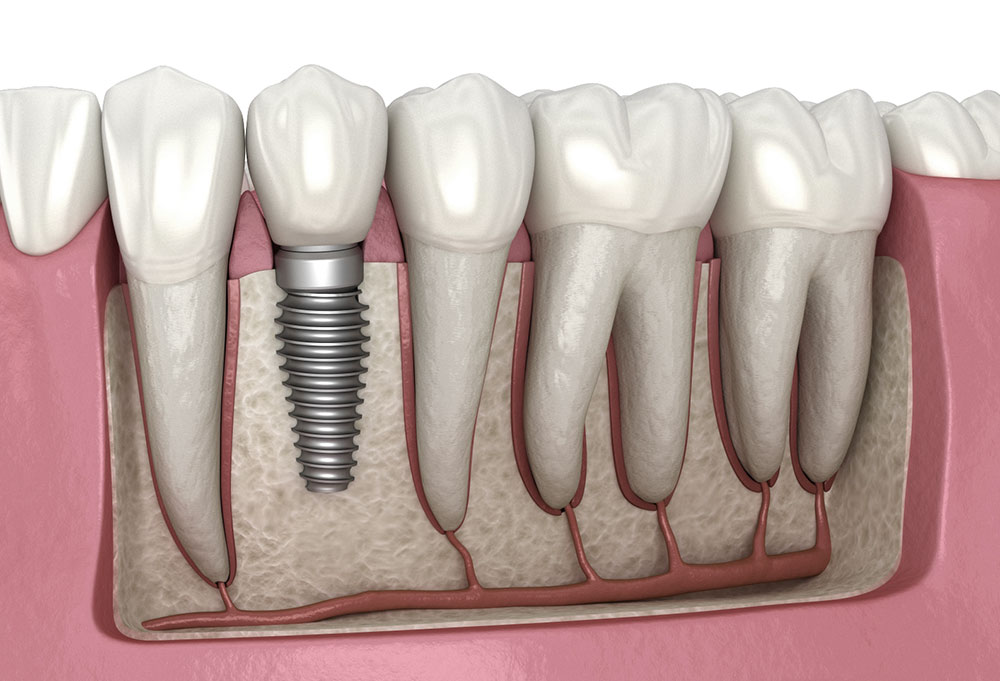
Dental implant, 3D illustration

A dental implant (also known as an endosseous implant or fixture) is a prosthesis that interfaces with the bone of the jaw or skull to support a dental prosthesis such as a crown, bridge, denture, or facial prosthesis or to act as an orthodontic anchor. The basis for modern dental implants is a biological process called osseointegration, in which materials such as titanium or zirconia form an intimate bond to the bone. The implant fixture is first placed so that it is likely to osseointegrate, then a dental prosthetic is added. A variable amount of healing time is required for osseointegration before either the dental prosthetic (a tooth, bridge, or denture) is attached to the implant or an abutment is placed which will hold a dental prosthetic or crown.

Success or failure of implants depends primarily on the thickness and health of the bone and gingival tissues that surround the implant, but also on the health of the person receiving the treatment and drugs which affect the chances of osseointegration. The amount of stress that will be put on the implant and fixture during normal function is also evaluated. Planning the position and number of implants is key to the long-term health of the prosthetic since biomechanical forces created during chewing can be significant. The position of implants is determined by the position and angle of adjacent teeth, by lab simulations or by using computed tomography with CAD/CAM simulations and surgical guides called stents. The prerequisites for long-term success of osseointegrated dental implants are healthy bone and gingiva. Since both can atrophy after tooth extraction, pre-prosthetic procedures such as sinus lifts or gingival grafts are sometimes required to recreate ideal bone and gingiva.

The final prosthetic can be either fixed, where a person cannot remove the denture or teeth from their mouth, or removable, where they can remove the prosthetic. In each case an abutment is attached to the implant fixture. Where the prosthetic is fixed, the crown, bridge or denture is fixed to the abutment either with lag screws or with dental cement. Where the prosthetic is removable, a corresponding adapter is placed in the prosthetic so that the two pieces can be secured together.

The risks and complications related to implant therapy divide into those that occur during surgery (such as excessive bleeding or nerve injury, inadequate primary stability), those that occur in the first six months (such as infection and failure to osseointegrate) and those that occur long-term (such as peri-implantitis and mechanical failures). In the presence of healthy tissues, a well-integrated implant with appropriate biomechanical loads can have 5-year plus survival rates from 93 to 98 percent and 10-to-15-year lifespans for the prosthetic teeth. Long-term studies show a 16- to 20-year success (implants surviving without complications or revisions) between 52% and 76%, with complications occurring up to 48% of the time.

== Medical uses ==
Common uses of dental implants

Individual teeth were replaced with implants where it is difficult to distinguish the real teeth from the prosthetic teeth.

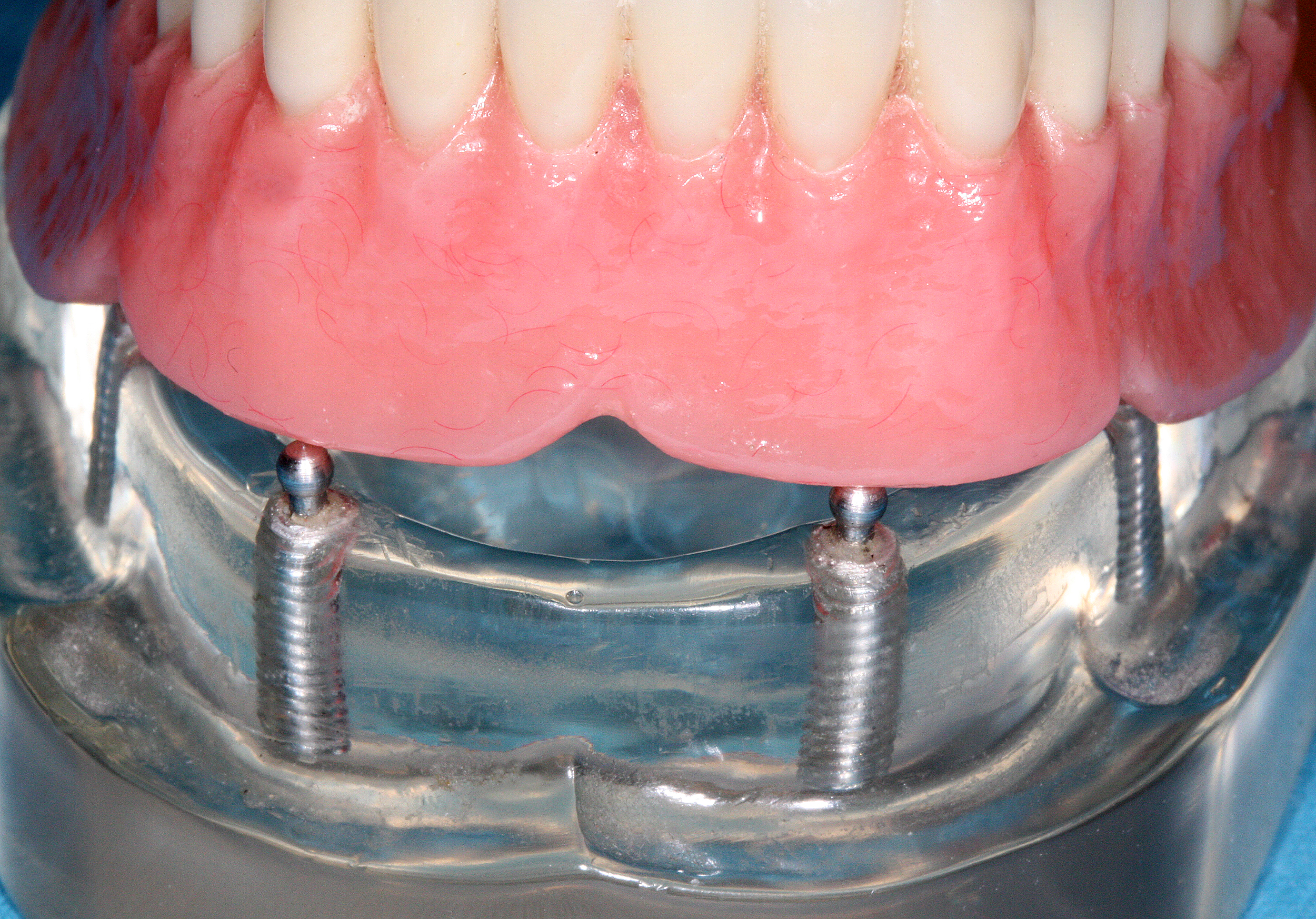
Movement in a lower denture can be decreased by implants with ball and socket retention.

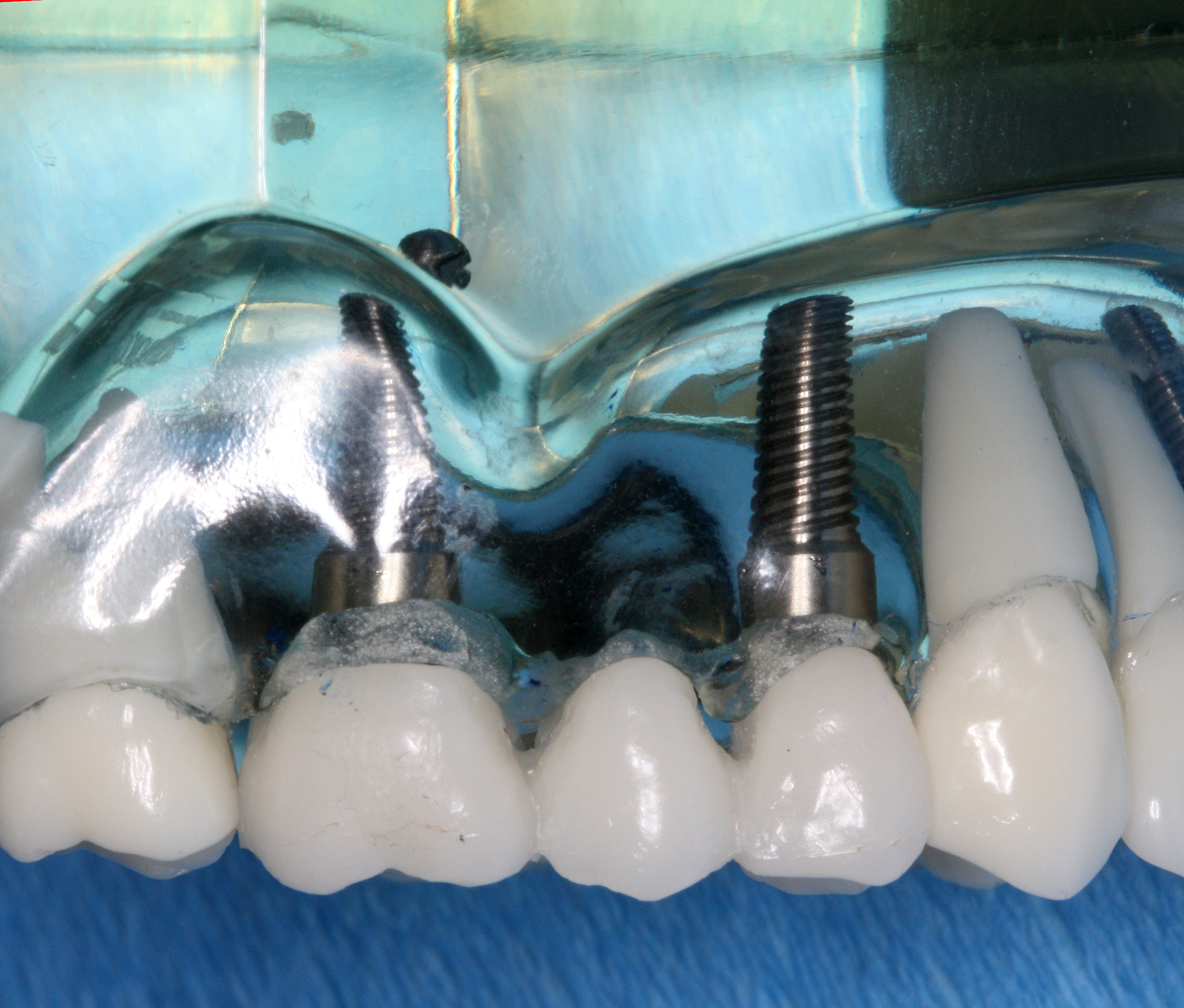
A bridge of teeth can be supported by two or more implants.

The primary use of dental implants is to support dental prosthetics (i.e. false teeth). Modern dental implants work through a biologic process where bone fuses tightly to the surface of specific materials such as titanium and some ceramics. The integration of implant and bone can support physical loads for decades without failure.

The US has seen an increasing use of dental implants, with usage increasing from 0.7% of patients missing at least one tooth (1999–2000), to 5.7% (2015–2016), and was projected to potentially reach 26% in 2026. Implants are used to replace missing individual teeth (single tooth restorations), multiple teeth, or to restore edentulous (toothless) dental arches (implant retained fixed bridge, implant-supported overdenture). While use of dental implants in the US has increased, other treatments to tooth loss exist.

Dental implants are also used in orthodontics to provide anchorage (orthodontic mini implants). Orthodontic treatment might be required prior to placing a dental implant. An evolving field is the use of implants to retain obturators (removable prostheses used to fill a communication between the oral and maxillary or nasal cavities). Facial prosthetics, used to correct facial deformities (e.g. from cancer treatment or injuries), can use connections to implants placed in the facial bones. Depending on the situation the implant may be used to retain either a fixed or removable prosthetic that replaces part of the face.

=== Single tooth implant restoration ===
Single tooth restorations are individual freestanding units not connected to other teeth or implants, used to replace missing individual teeth. For individual tooth replacement, an implant abutment is first secured to the implant with an abutment screw. A crown (the dental prosthesis) is then connected to the abutment with dental cement, a small screw, or fused with the abutment as one piece during fabrication. Dental implants, in the same way, can also be used to retain a multiple tooth dental prosthesis either in the form of a fixed bridge or removable dentures.

There is limited evidence that implant-supported single crowns perform better than tooth-supported fixed partial dentures (FPDs) on a long-term basis. However, taking into account the favorable cost-benefit ratio and the high implant survival rate, dental implant therapy is the first-line strategy for single-tooth replacement. Implants preserve the integrity of the teeth adjacent to the edentulous area, and it has been shown that dental implant therapy is less costly and more efficient over time than tooth-supported FPDs for the replacement of one missing tooth. The major disadvantage of dental implant surgery is the need for a surgical procedure.

=== Implant retained fixed bridge or implant supported bridge ===
An implant supported bridge (or fixed denture) is a group of teeth secured to dental implants so the prosthetic cannot be removed by the user. They are similar to conventional bridges, except that the prosthesis is supported and retained by one or more implants instead of natural teeth. Bridges typically connect to more than one implant and may also connect to teeth as anchor points. Typically the number of teeth will outnumber the anchor points with the teeth that are directly over the implants referred to as abutments and those between abutments referred to as pontics. Implant supported bridges attach to implant abutments in the same way as a single tooth implant replacement. A fixed bridge may replace as few as two teeth (also known as a fixed partial denture) and may extend to replace an entire arch of teeth (also known as a fixed full denture). In both cases, the prosthesis is said to be fixed because it cannot be removed by the denture wearer.

=== Implant-supported overdenture ===
A removable implant-supported denture (also an implant-supported overdenture) is a removable prosthesis which replaces teeth, using implants to improve support, retention and stability. They are most commonly complete dentures (as opposed to partial), used to restore edentulous dental arches. The dental prosthesis can be disconnected from the implant abutments with finger pressure by the wearer. To enable this, the abutment is shaped as a small connector (a button, ball, bar or magnet) which can be connected to analogous adapters in the underside of the dental prosthesis.

=== Temporary anchorage devices (TAD) ===
Dental implants are used in orthodontic patients to replace missing teeth or as a temporary anchorage device (TAD) or orthodontic mini-implants to facilitate orthodontic movement by providing an additional anchorage point. For teeth to move, a force must be applied to them in the direction of the desired movement. The force stimulates cells in the periodontal ligament to cause bone remodeling, removing bone in the direction of travel of the tooth and adding it to the space created. In order to generate a force on a tooth, an anchor point (something that will not move) is needed. Since implants do not have a periodontal ligament, and bone remodelling will not be stimulated when tension is applied, they are ideal anchor points in orthodontics. Typically, implants designed for orthodontic movement are small and do not fully osseointegrate, allowing easy removal following treatment. They are indicated when needing to shorten treatment time, or as an alternative to extra-oral anchorage. Mini-implants are frequently placed between the roots of teeth, but may also be sited in the roof of the mouth. They are then connected to a fixed brace to help move the teeth.

=== Small-diameter implants (mini-implants) ===
The introduction of small-diameter implants has provided dentists the means of providing edentulous and partially edentulous patients with immediate functioning transitional prostheses while definitive restorations are being fabricated. Many clinical studies have been done on the success of long-term usage of these implants. Based on the findings of many studies, mini dental implants exhibit excellent survival rates in the short to medium term (3–5 years). They appear to be a reasonable alternative treatment modality to retain mandibular complete overdentures from the available evidence.

== Composition ==
Types of implants

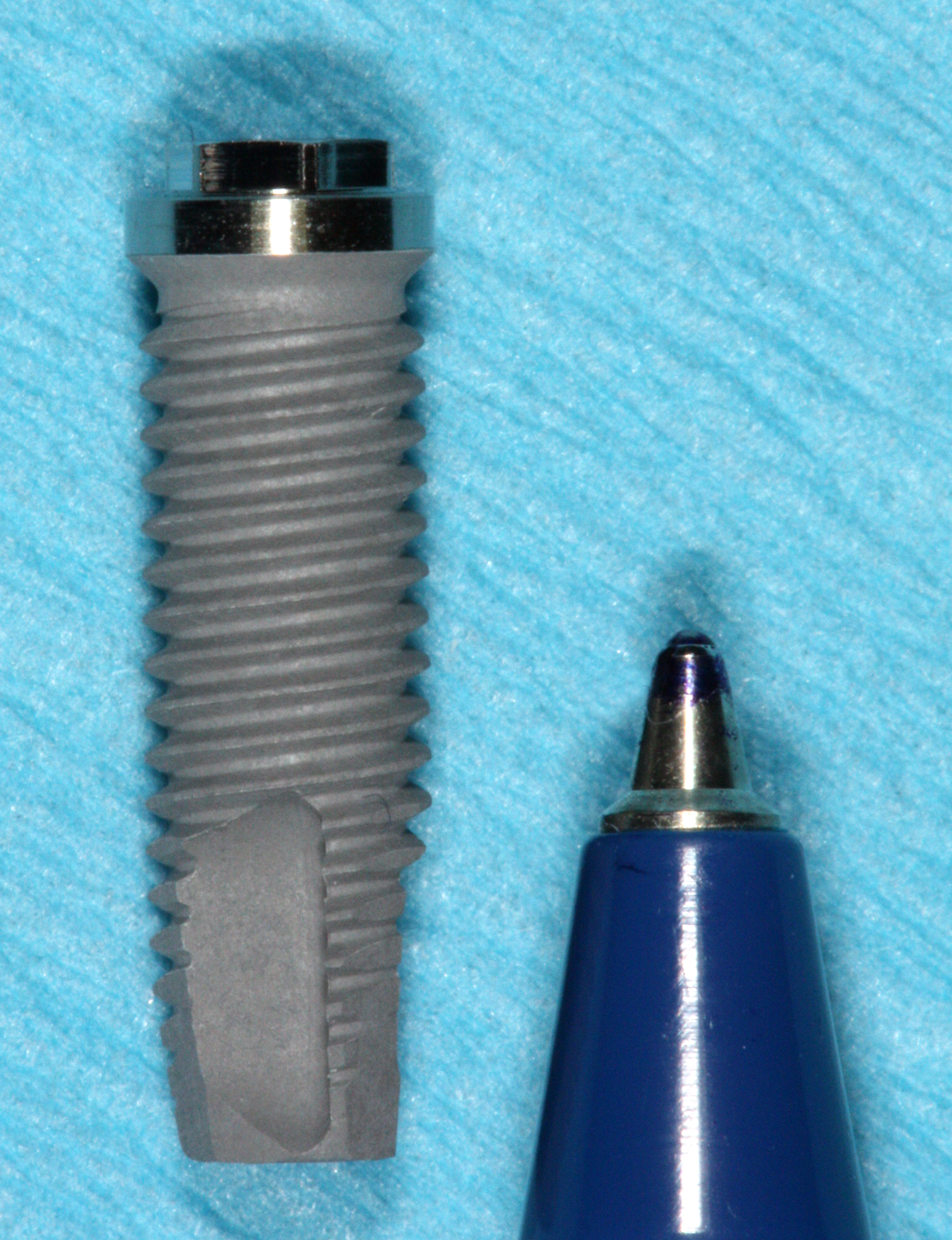
A standard 13 mm root form dental implant with pen beside it for size comparison

A zygomatic implant is longer than standard implants and used in people without adequate bone in the maxilla. It secures to the cheek bone.

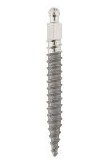
A small diameter implant is a single piece implant (no abutment) that requires less bone.

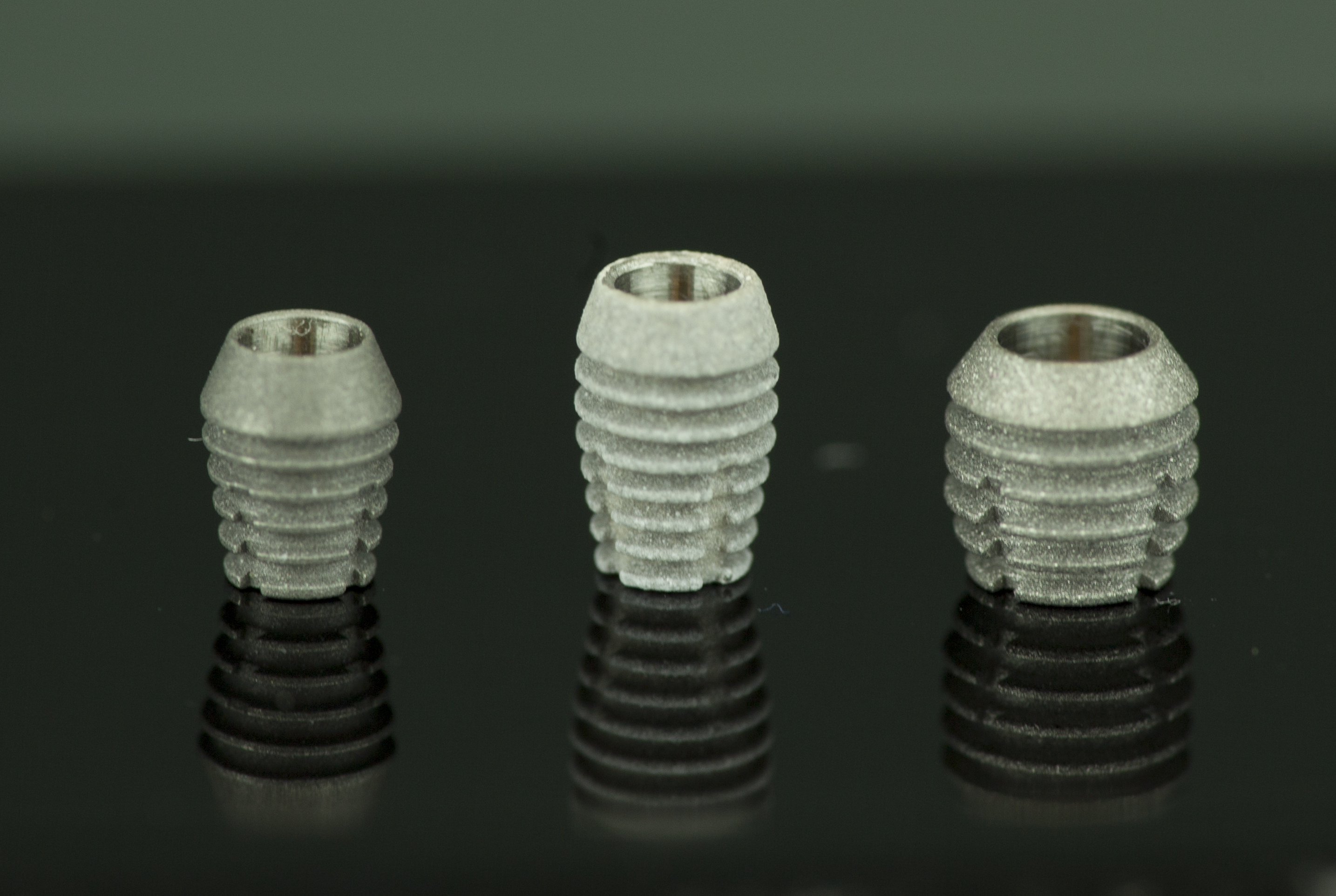
Ultrashort Plateau Root Form (PRF) or "finned" dental implants used in regions that would otherwise require a sinus lift or bone graft.

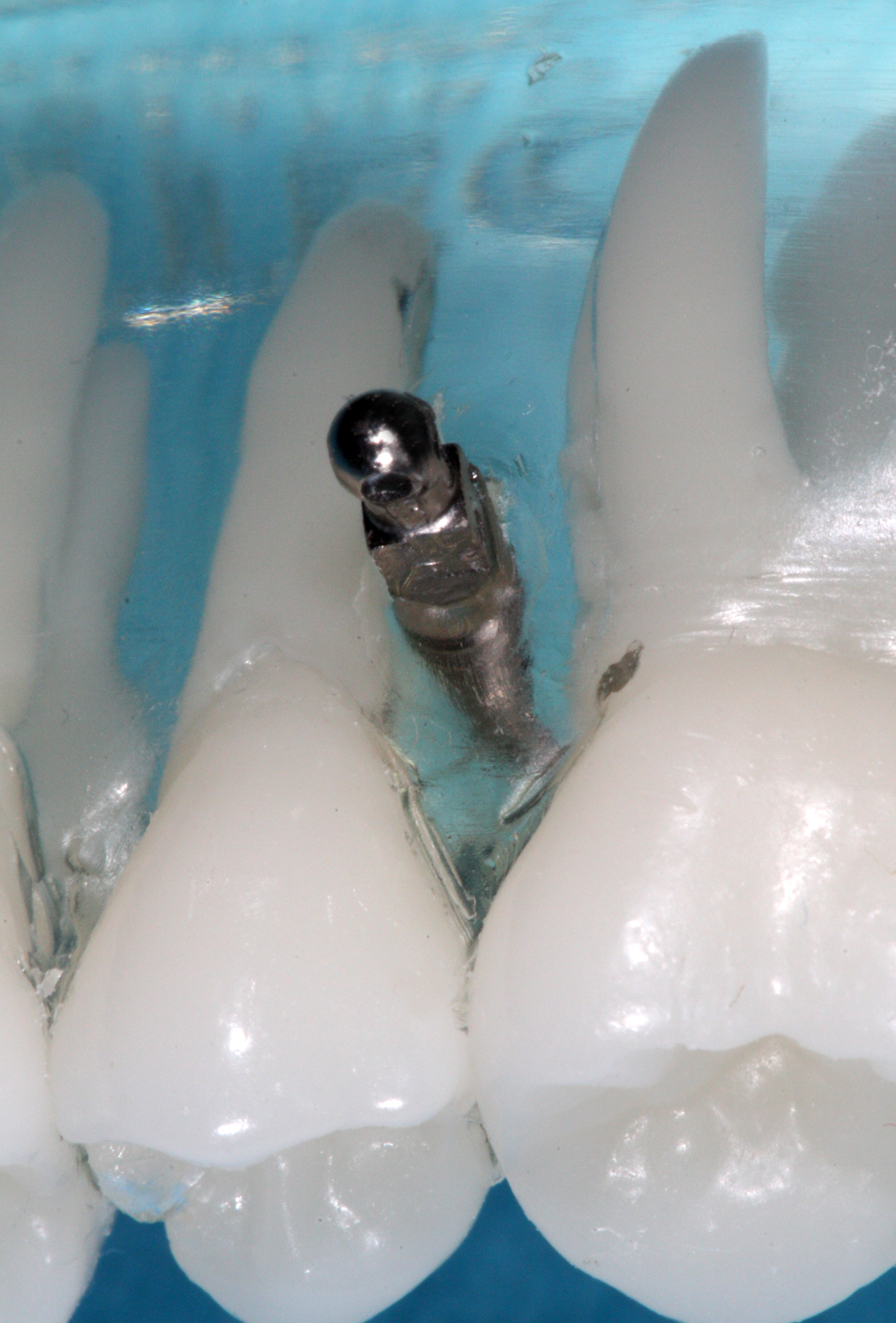
An orthodontic implant is placed beside teeth to act as an anchor point to which braces can be secured.

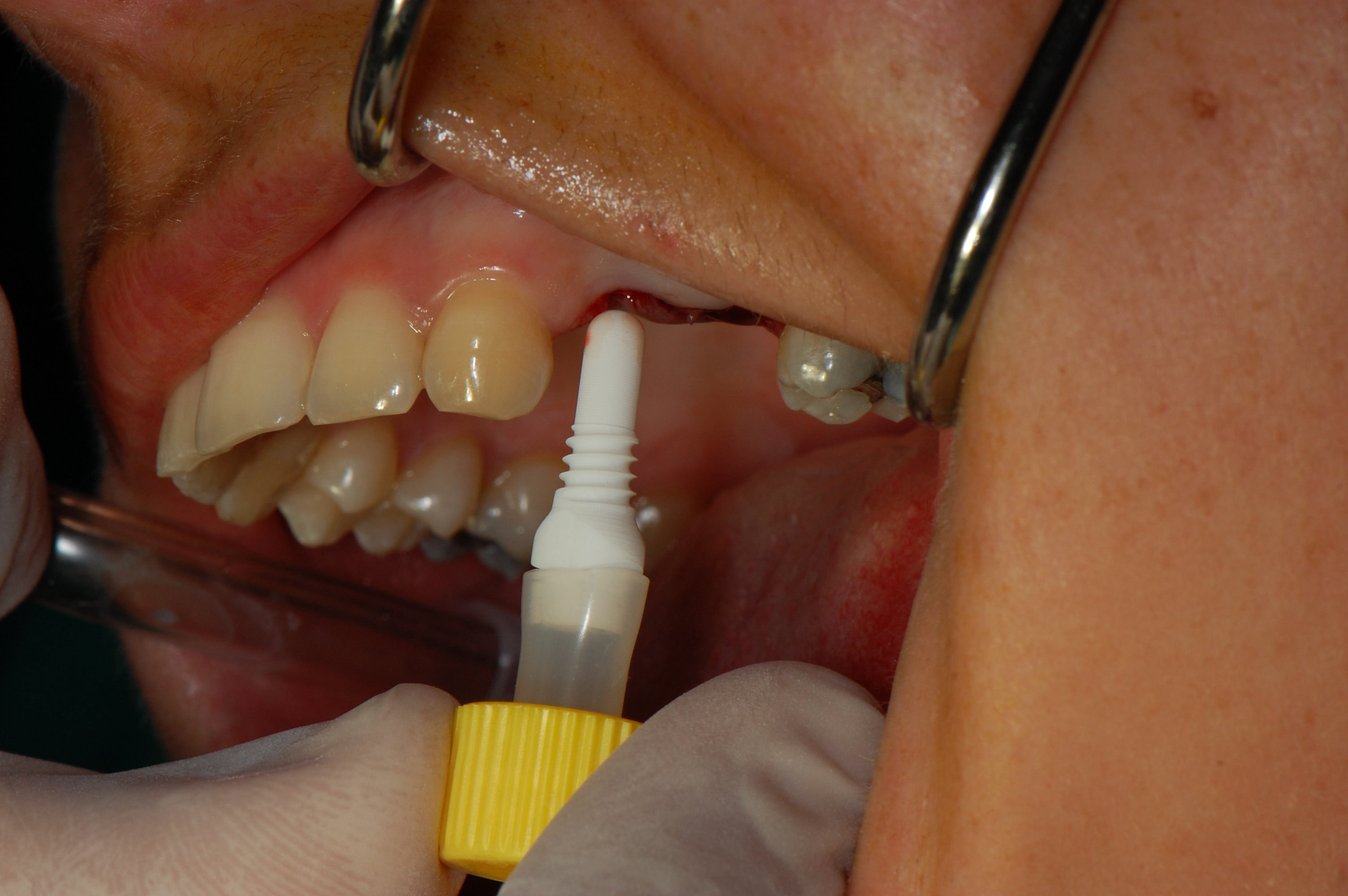
A one-piece all-ceramic implant

A typical conventional implant consists of a titanium screw (resembling a tooth root) with a roughened or smooth surface. The majority of dental implants are made of commercially pure titanium, which is available in four grades depending upon the amount of carbon, nitrogen, oxygen and iron contained. Cold work hardened CP4 (maximum impurity limits of N .05 percent, C .10 percent, H .015 percent, Fe .50 percent, and O .40 percent) is the most commonly used titanium for implants. Grade 5 titanium, Titanium 6AL-4V (signifying the titanium alloy containing 6 percent aluminium and 4 percent vanadium alloy) is slightly harder than CP4 and used in the industry mostly for abutment screws and abutments. Most modern dental implants also have a textured surface (through etching, anodic oxidation or various-media blasting) to increase the surface area and osseointegration potential of the implant. If C.P. titanium or a titanium alloy has more than 85% titanium content, it will form a titanium-biocompatible titanium oxide surface layer or veneer that encloses the other metals, preventing them from contacting the bone.

Ceramic (zirconia-based) implants exist in one-piece (combining the screw and the abutment) or two-piece systems – the abutment being either cemented or screwed – and might lower the risk for peri‐implant diseases, but long-term data on success rates is missing.

== Technique ==
=== Implantology ===
Implantology (from Latin in meaning 'into' and planta 'cutting,' and -logy from the Greek λόγος lógos 'word,' 'study,') is the term for the placement of dental implants by a dentist, specialist dentist in oral surgery, or oral and maxillofacial surgeons. With a license to practice, every dentist obtains permission to practice the full range of dentistry and thus also to place dental implants. The 'focus area in implantology' established in 2001 by the European Association of Dental Implantologists (BDIZ EDI) before the Federal Constitutional Court is not an additional designation according to the training regulations and is not granted under public law.

=== Planning ===
Techniques used to plan implants

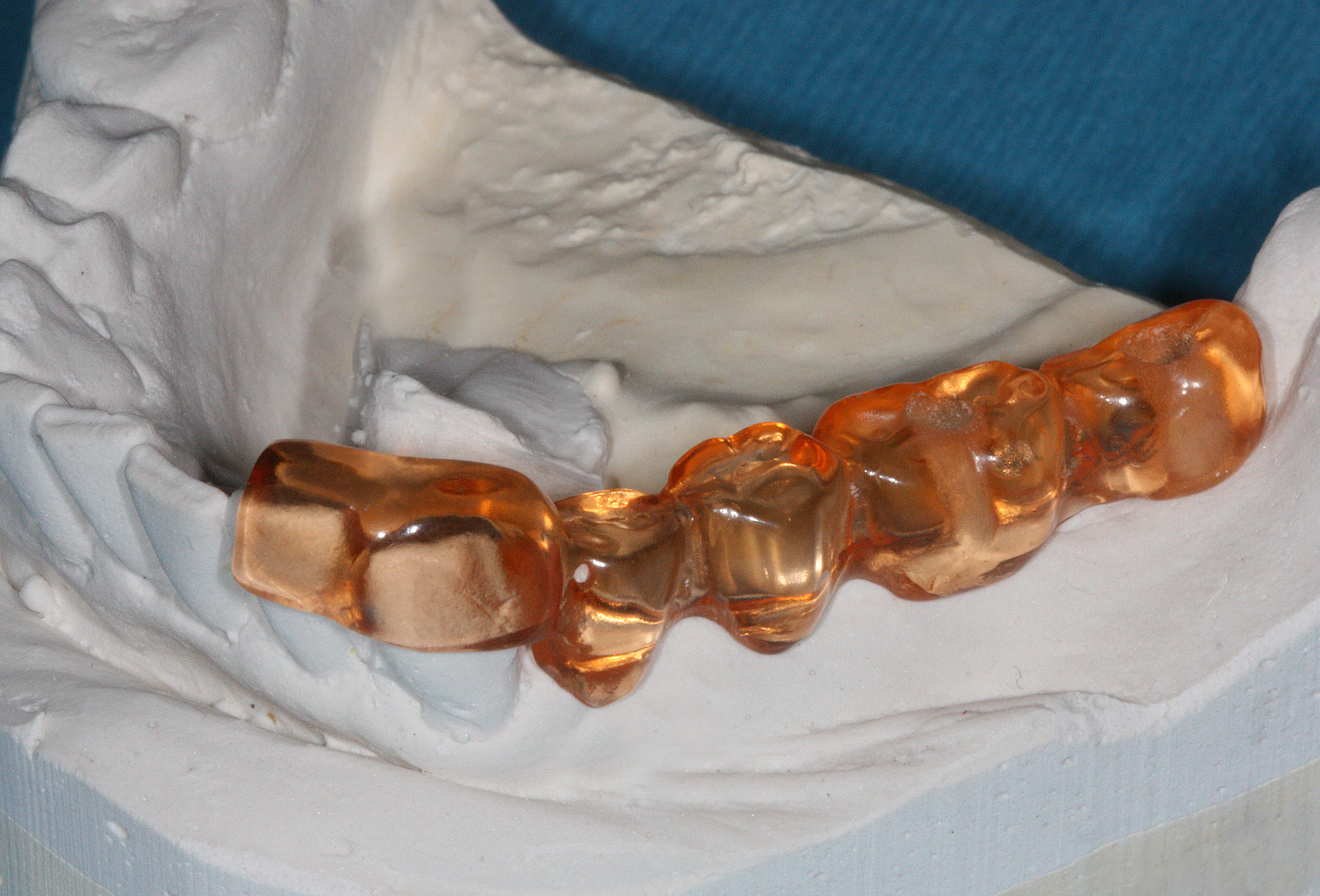
To help the surgeon position the implants a guide is made (usually out of acrylic) to show the desired position and angulation of the implants.

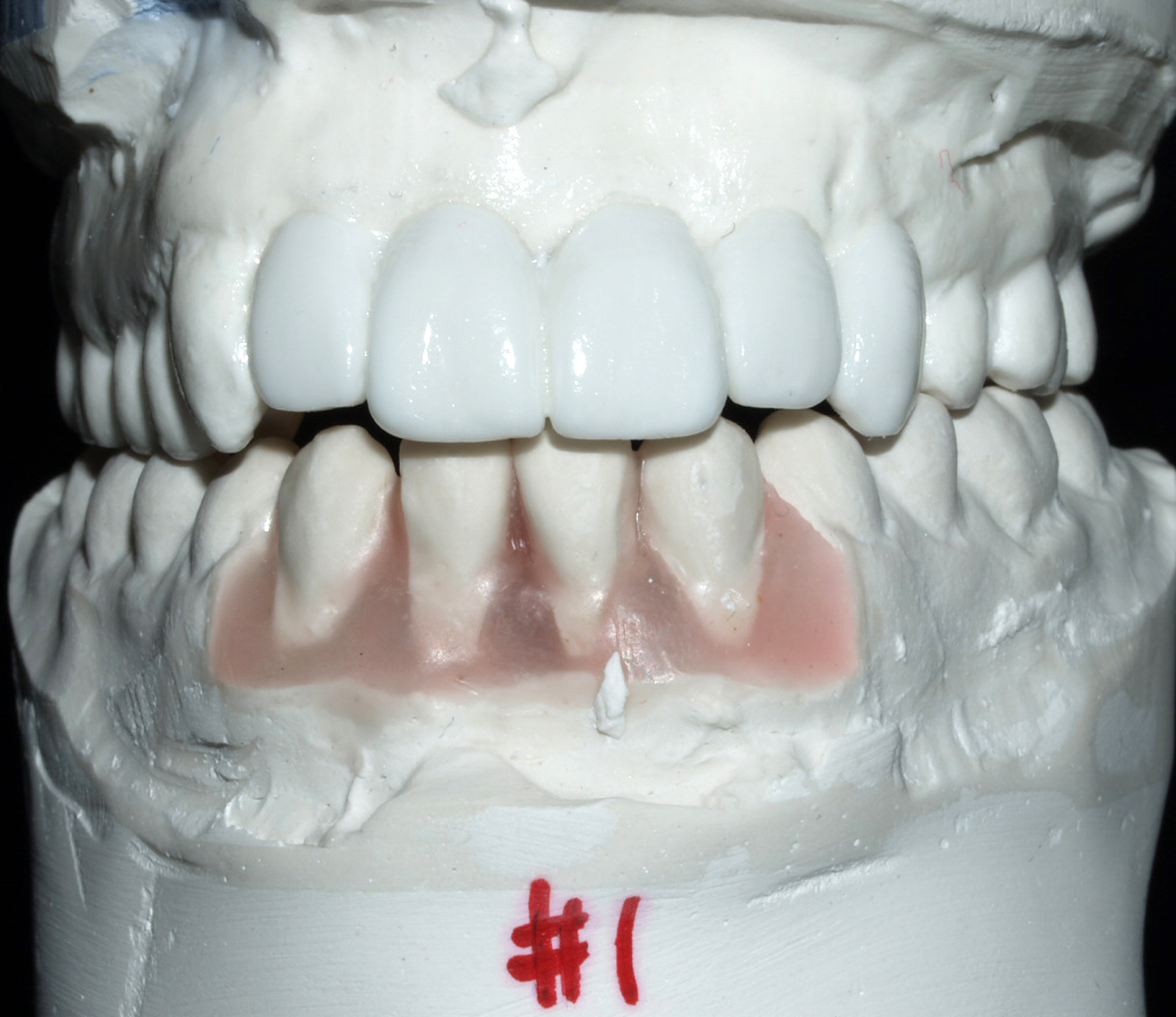
Sometimes the final position and restoration of the teeth will be simulated on plaster models to help determine the number and position of implants needed.

CT scans can be loaded to CAD/CAM software to create a simulation of the desired treatment. Virtual implants are then placed and a stent created on a 3D printer from the data.

==== General considerations ====
Planning for dental implants focuses on the general health condition of the patient, the local health condition of the mucous membranes and the jaws and the shape, size, and position of the bones of the jaws, adjacent and opposing teeth. There are few health conditions that absolutely preclude placing implants and there are certain conditions that can increase the risk of failure. Those with poor oral hygiene, heavy smokers and diabetics are all at greater risk for a variant of gum disease that affects implants called peri-implantitis, increasing the chance of long-term failures. Long-term steroid use, osteoporosis and other diseases that affect the bones can increase the risk of early failure of implants. It has been suggested that radiotherapy can negatively affect the survival of implants. Nevertheless, a systemic study published in 2016 concluded that dental implants installed in the irradiated area of an oral cavity may have a high survival rate, provided that the patient maintains oral hygiene measures and regular follow-ups to prevent complications.

==== Biomechanical considerations ====
The long-term success of implants is determined in part by the forces they have to support. As implants have no periodontal ligament, there is no sensation of pressure when biting so the forces created are higher. To offset this, the location of implants must distribute forces evenly across the prosthetics they support. Concentrated forces can result in fracture of the bridgework, implant components, or loss of bone adjacent the implant. The ultimate location of implants is based on both biologic (bone type, vital structures, health) and mechanical factors. Implants placed in thicker, stronger bone like that found in the front part of the bottom jaw have lower failure rates than implants placed in lower density bone, such as the back part of the upper jaw. People who grind their teeth also increase the force on implants and increase the likelihood of failures.

The design of implants has to account for a lifetime of real-world use in a person's mouth. Regulators and the dental implant industry have created a series of tests to determine the long-term mechanical reliability of implants in a person's mouth where the implant is struck repeatedly with increasing forces (similar in magnitude to biting) until it fails. When a more exacting plan is needed beyond clinical judgment, the dentist will make an acrylic guide (called a stent) prior to surgery which guides optimal positioning of the implant. Increasingly, dentists opt to get a CT scan of the jaws and any existing dentures, then plan the surgery on CAD/CAM software. The stent can then be made using stereolithography following computerized planning of a case from the CT scan. The use of CT scanning in complex cases also helps the surgeon identify and avoid vital structures such as the inferior alveolar nerve and the sinus.

==== Bisphosphonate drugs ====
The use of bone-building drugs, like bisphosphonates and anti-RANKL drugs, requires special consideration with implants because they have been associated with a disorder called medication-associated osteonecrosis of the jaw (MRONJ). The drugs change bone turnover, which is thought to put people at risk for death of bone when having minor oral surgery. At routine doses (for example, those used to treat routine osteoporosis) the effects of the drugs linger for months or years but the risk appears to be very low. Because of this duality, uncertainty exists in the dental community about how to best manage the risk of BRONJ when placing implants. A 2009 position paper by the American Association of Oral and Maxillofacial Surgeons discussed that the risk of BRONJ from low dose oral therapy (or slow-release injectable) as between 0.01 and 0.06 percent for any procedure done on the jaws (implant, extraction, etc.). The risk is higher with intravenous therapy, procedures on the lower jaw, people with other medical issues, those on steroids, those on more potent bisphosphonates and people who have taken the drug for more than three years. The position paper recommends against placing implants in people who are taking high-dose or high-frequency intravenous therapy for cancer care. Otherwise, implants can generally be placed and the use of bisphosphonates does not appear to affect implant survival. Additional precaution can be taken by administering pentoxifylline and tocopherol both pre-operatively and post-operatively. Moreover, patients taking bisphosphonates present a higher risk of implant failure in comparison to patients not taking this class of drugs.

=== Main surgical procedures ===
Basic implant surgical procedure

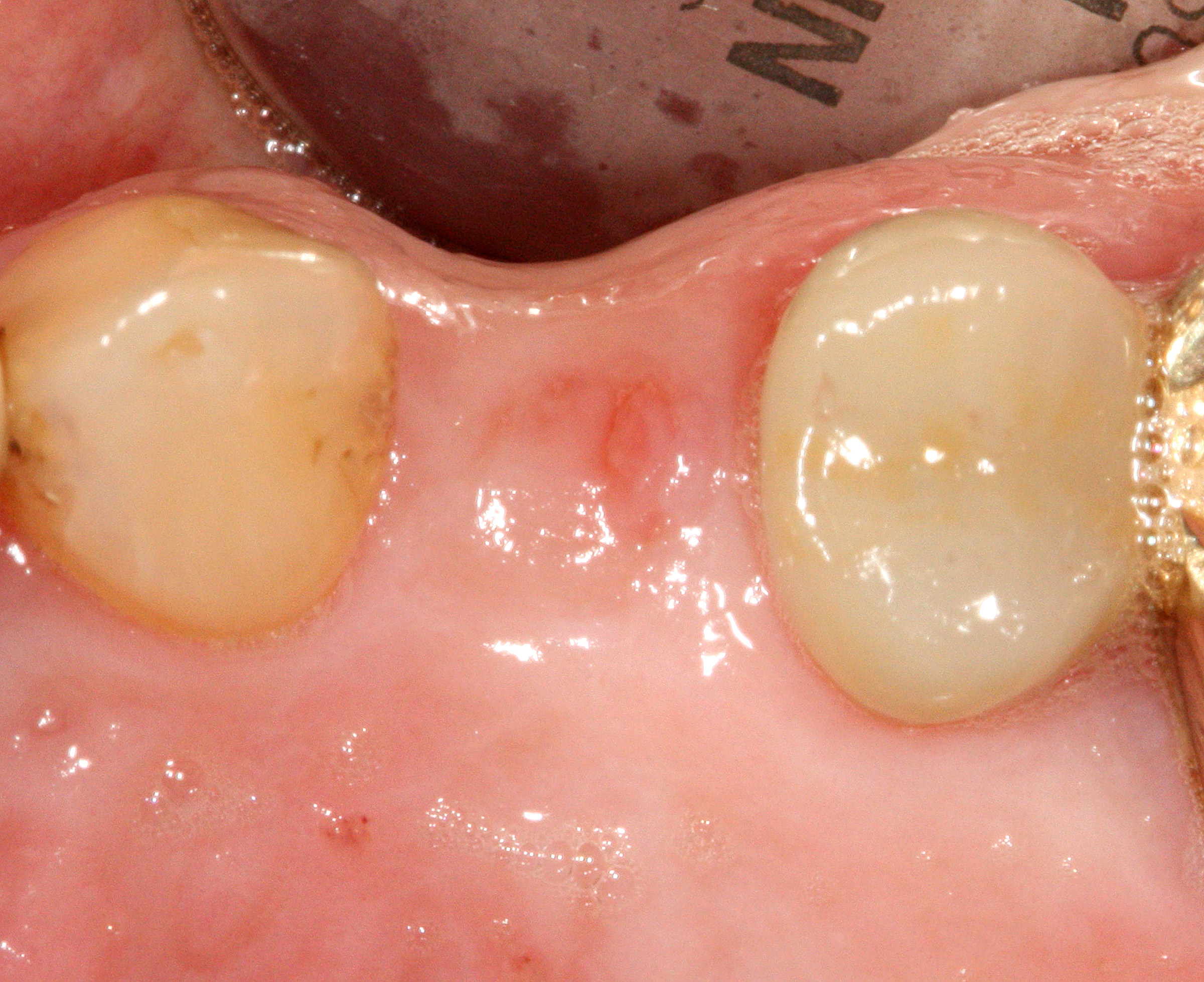
An area with a single missing tooth

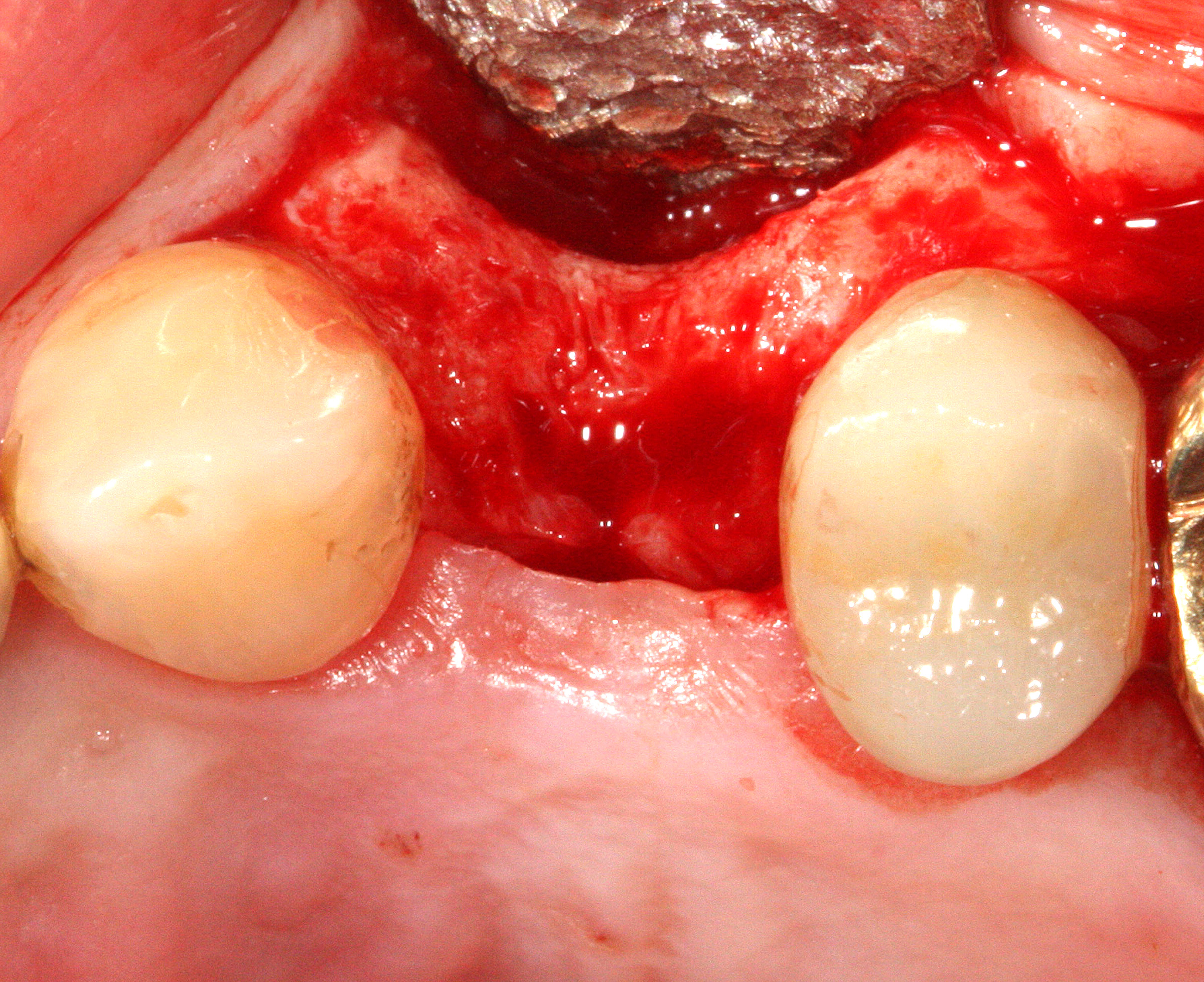
An incision is made across the gingiva, and the flap of tissue is reflected to show the bone of the jaw.

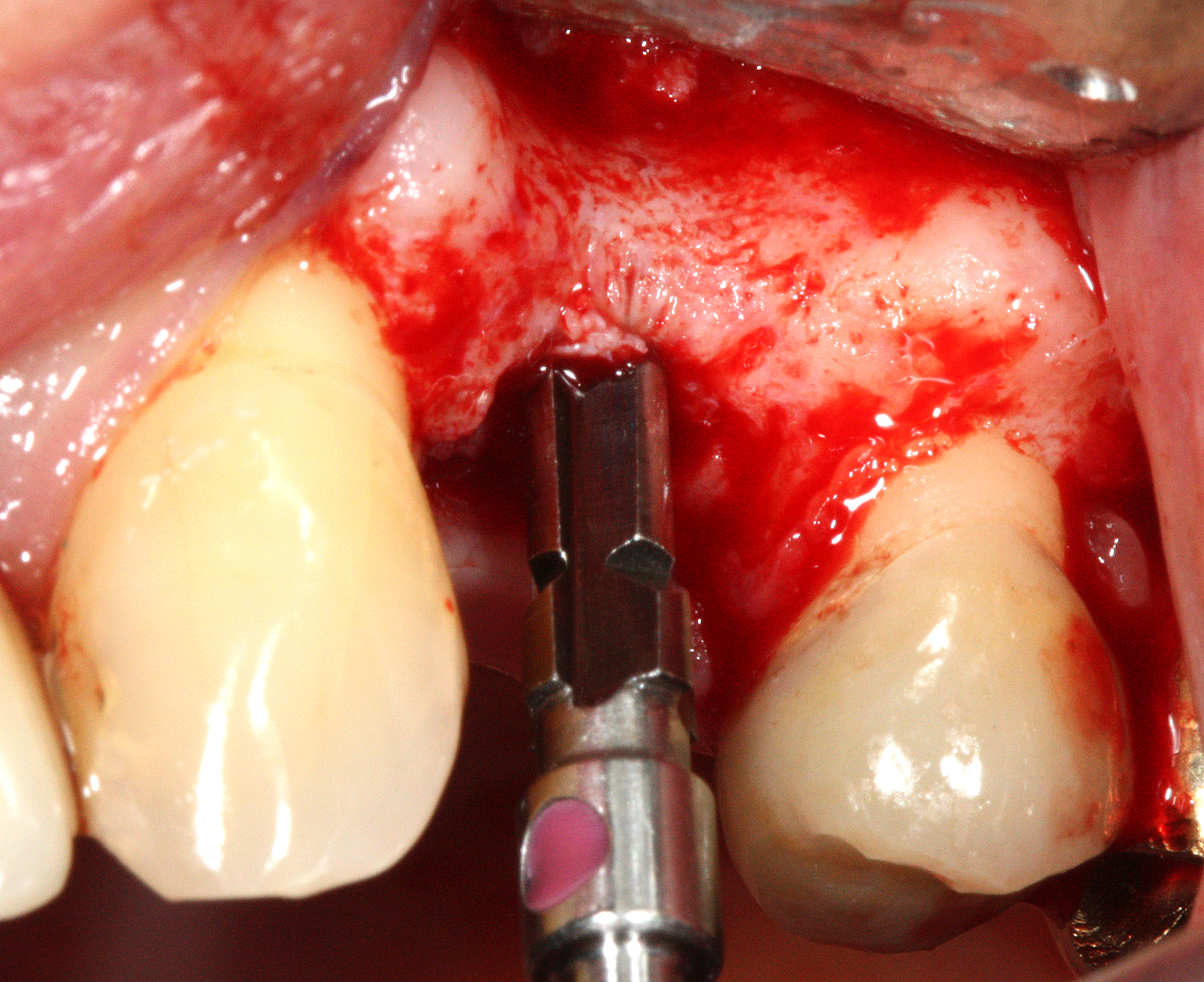
Once the bone is exposed, a series of drills create and gradually enlarge a site (called an osteotomy) for the implant to be placed.

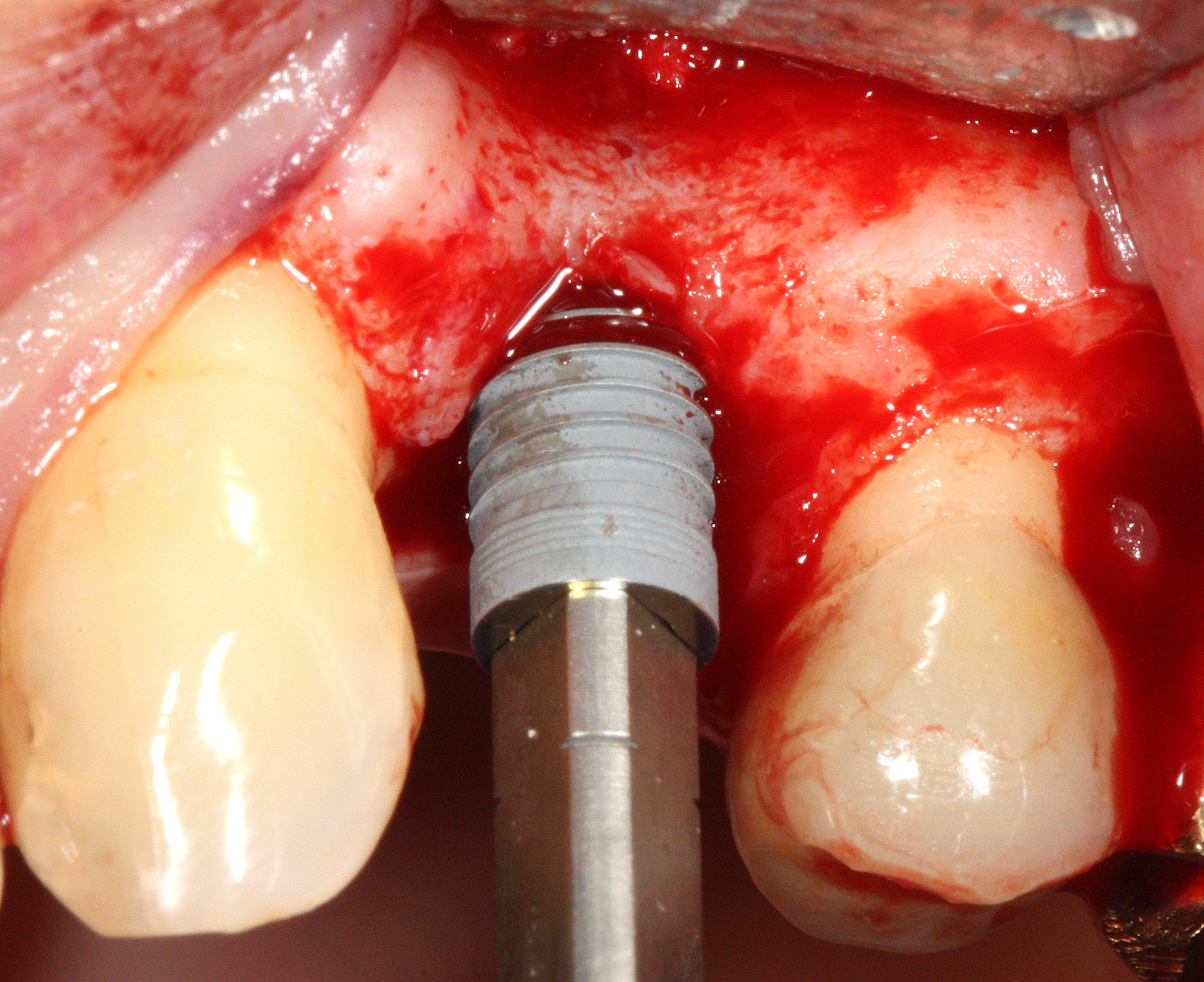
The implant fixture is turned into the osteotomy. Ideally, it is completely covered by bone and has no movement within the bone.

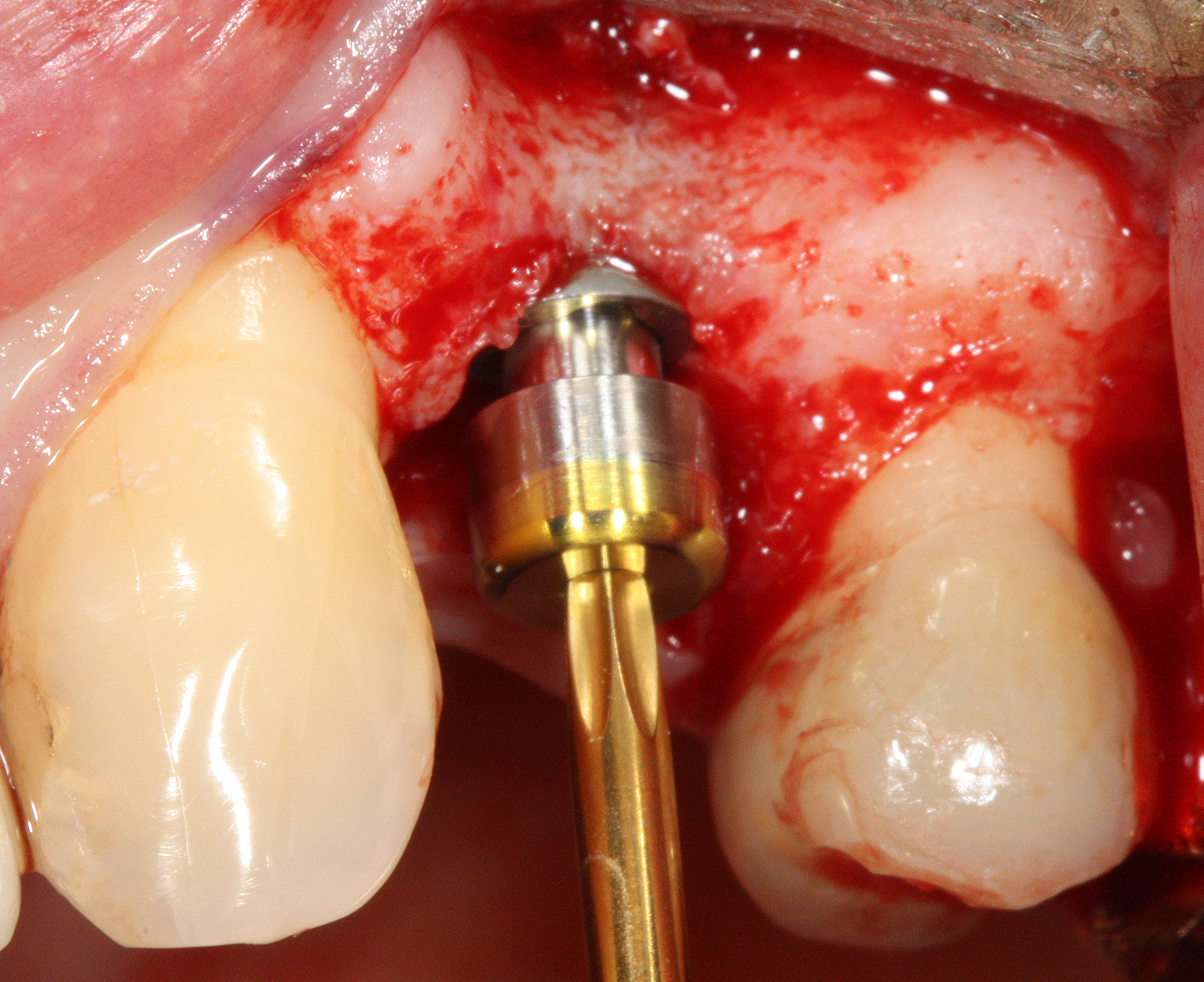
A healing abutment is attached to the implant fixture, and the flap of gingiva is sutured around the healing abutment.

==== Placing the implant ====
Most implant systems have five basic steps for placement of each implant:

1. Soft tissue reflection: An incision is made over the crest of bone, splitting the thicker attached gingiva roughly in half so that the final implant will have a thick band of tissue around it. The edges of tissue, each referred to as a flap, are pushed back to expose the bone. Flapless surgery is an alternate technique, where a small punch of tissue (the diameter of the implant) is removed for implant placement rather than raising flaps.
2. Drilling at high speed: After reflecting the soft tissue, and using a surgical guide or stent as necessary, pilot holes are placed with precision drills at highly regulated speed to prevent burning or pressure necrosis of the bone.
3. Drilling at low speed: The pilot hole is expanded by using progressively wider drills (typically between three and seven successive drilling steps, depending on implant width and length). Care is taken not to damage the osteoblast or bone cells by overheating. A cooling saline or water spray keeps the temperature low.
4. Placement of the implant: The implant screw is placed and can be self-tapping; otherwise, the prepared site is tapped with an implant analog. It is then screwed into place with a torque controlled wrench at a precise torque so as not to overload the surrounding bone (overloaded bone can die, a condition called osteonecrosis, which may lead to failure of the implant to fully integrate or bond with the jawbone).
5. Tissue adaptation: The gingiva is adapted around the entire implant to provide a thick band of healthy tissue around the healing abutment. In contrast, an implant can be "buried", where the top of the implant is sealed with a cover screw and the tissue is closed to completely cover it. A second procedure would then be required to uncover the implant at a later date.

==== Timing of implants after extraction of teeth ====
There are different approaches to placement dental implants after tooth extraction. The approaches are:

1. Immediate post-extraction implant placement.
2. Delayed immediate post-extraction implant placement (two weeks to three months after extraction).
3. Late implantation (three months or more after tooth extraction).

An increasingly common strategy to preserve bone and reduce treatment times includes the placement of a dental implant into a recent extraction site. On the one hand, it shortens treatment time and can improve aesthetics because the soft tissue envelope is preserved. On the other hand, implants may have a slightly higher rate of initial failure. Conclusions on this topic are difficult to draw, however, because few studies have compared immediate and delayed implants in a scientifically rigorous manner.

==== One versus two-stage surgery ====
After an implant is placed the internal components are covered with either a healing abutment, or a cover screw. A healing abutment passes through the mucosa, and the surrounding mucosa is adapted around it. A cover screw is flush with the surface of the dental implant, and is designed to be completely covered by mucosa. After an integration period, a second surgery is required to reflect the mucosa and place a healing abutment.

In the early stages of implant development (1970−1990) implant systems used a two-stage approach, believing that it improved the odds of initial implant survival. Subsequent research suggests that no difference in implant survival existed between one-stage and two-stage surgeries, and the choice of whether or not to "bury" the implant in the first stage of surgery became a concern of soft tissue (gingiva) management. When tissue is inadequate, deficient or mutilated by the loss of teeth, adjacent bone or gingiva, implants are placed and allowed to osseointegrate, then the gingival flat is surgically placed around the healing abutments. The downside of a two-stage technique is the need for additional surgery and compromise of circulation to the tissue due to repeated surgeries. The choice of one or two stages now centers around how best to reconstruct the soft tissues around lost teeth.

=== Additional procedures to augment deficient bone in implant site ===
Hard tissue reconstruction

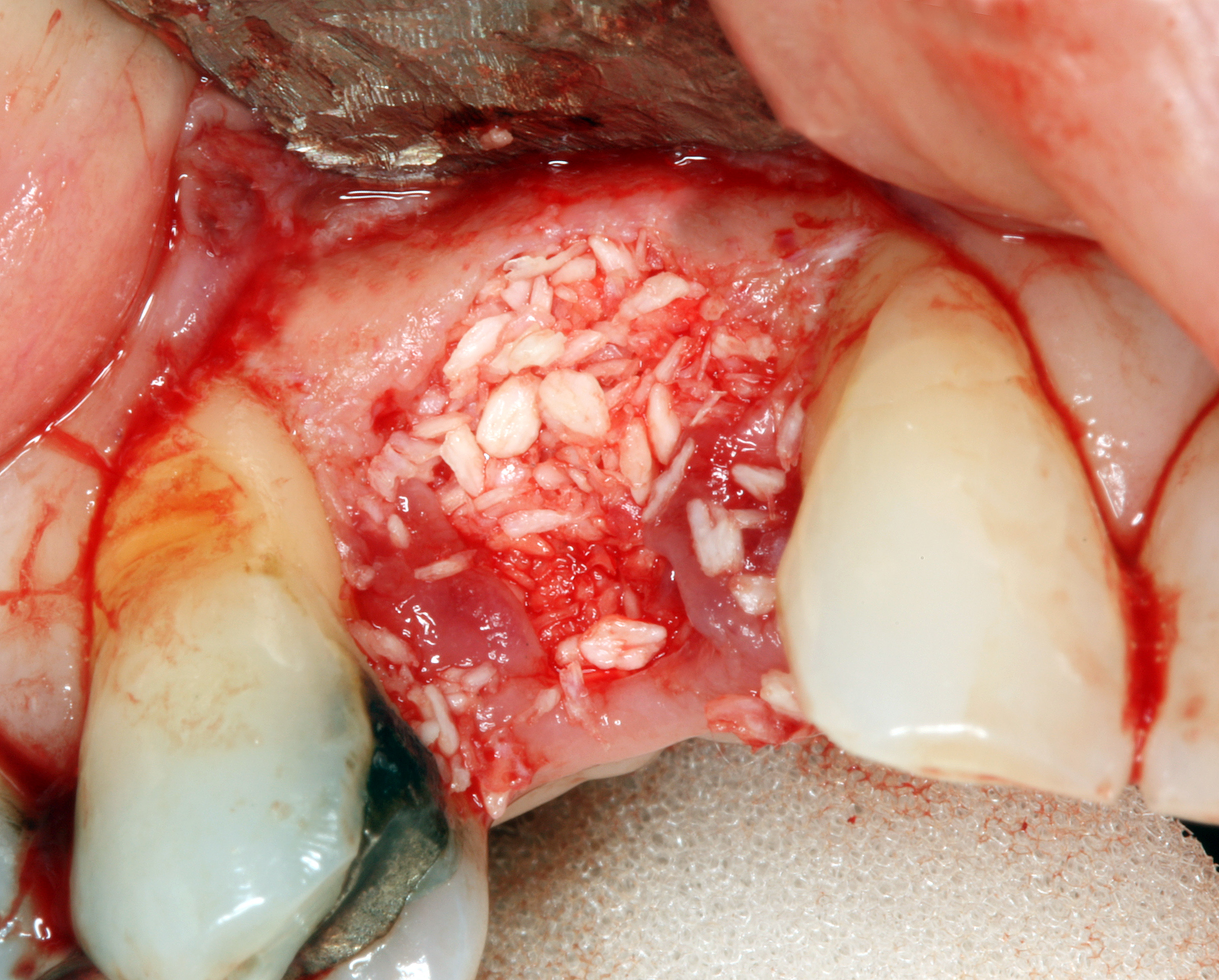
If bone width is inadequate it can be regrown using either artificial or cadaveric bone pieces to act as a scaffold for natural bone to grow around.

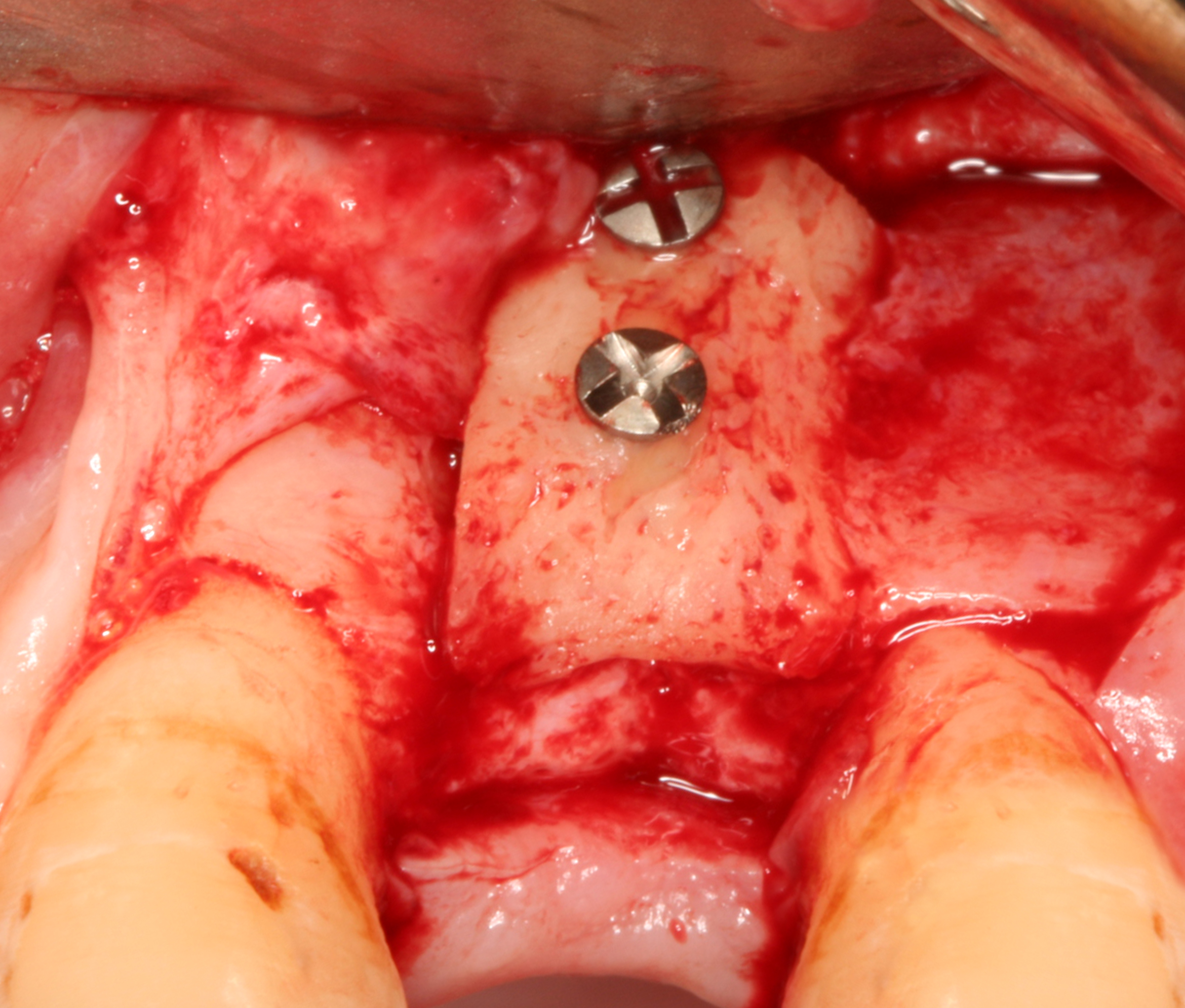
When a greater amount of bone is needed, it can be taken from another site (commonly the back of the bottom jaw) and transplanted to the implant site.

The maxillary sinus can limit the amount of bone height in the back of the upper jaw. With a "sinus lift", bone can be grafted under the sinus membrane increasing the height of bone.

For an implant to osseointegrate, it needs to be surrounded by a healthy quantity of bone. In order for it to survive long-term, it needs to have a thick healthy soft tissue (gingiva) envelope around it. It is common for either the bone or soft tissue to be so deficient that the surgeon needs to reconstruct it either before or during implant placement. All techniques of augmenting the alveolar bone in preparation for implant placement are invasive and associated with a degree of morbidity.

==== Hard tissue (bone) reconstruction ====
Bone grafting is necessary when there is a lack of bone. It also helps to stabilize the implant by increasing survival rates of the implant and decreasing marginal bone level loss. While there are always new implant types, such as short implants, and techniques to allow compromise, a general treatment goal is to have a minimum of 10 mm (0.39 in) in bone height, and 6 mm (0.24 in) in width. Alternatively, bone defects are graded from A to D (A=10+ mm of bone, B=7–9 mm, C=4–6 mm and D=0–3 mm) where an implant's likelihood of osseointegrating is related to the grade of bone.

To achieve an adequate width and height of bone, various bone grafting techniques have been developed. The most frequently used is called guided bone graft augmentation where a defect is filled with either natural (harvested or autograft) bone or allograft (donor bone or synthetic bone substitute), covered with a semi-permeable membrane and allowed to heal. During the healing phase, natural bone replaces the graft, forming a new bony base for the implant.

Three common procedures are:

1. Sinus lift
2. Lateral alveolar augmentation (increase in the width of a site)
3. Vertical alveolar augmentation (increase in the height of a site)

Other, more invasive procedures, also exist for larger bone defects including mobilization of the inferior alveolar nerve to allow placement of a fixture, onlay bone grafting using the iliac crest or another large source of bone and microvascular bone graft where the blood supply to the bone is transplanted with the source bone and reconnected to the local blood supply. The final decision about which bone grafting technique that is best is based on an assessment of the degree of vertical and horizontal bone loss that exists, each of which is classified into mild (2–3 mm loss), moderate (4–6 mm loss) or severe (greater than 6 mm loss). Orthodontic extrusion or orthodontic implant site development can be used in selected cases for vertical/horizontal alveolar augmentation.

==== Soft tissue (gingiva) reconstruction ====
Soft tissue reconstruction

When mucosa is missing, a free gingival graft of soft tissue can be transplanted to the area.

When the metal of an implant becomes visible a connective tissue graft can be used to improve the mucosal height.

The gingiva surrounding a tooth has a 2–3 mm band of bright pink, very strong attached mucosa, then a darker, larger area of unattached mucosa that folds into the cheeks. When replacing a tooth with an implant, a band of strong, attached gingiva is needed to keep the implant healthy in the long-term. This is especially important with implants because the blood supply is more precarious in the gingiva surrounding an implant, and is theoretically more susceptible to injury because of a longer attachment to the implant than on a tooth (a longer biologic width).

When an adequate band of attached tissue is absent, it can be recreated with a soft tissue graft. There are four methods that can be used to transplant soft tissue. A roll of tissue adjacent to an implant (referred to as a palatal roll) can be moved towards the lip (buccal), gingiva from the palate can be transplanted, deeper connective tissue from the palate can be transplanted or, when a larger piece of tissue is needed, a finger of tissue based on a blood vessel in the palate (called a vascularized interpositional periosteal-connective tissue (VIP-CT) flap) can be repositioned to the area.Xenogeneic collagen matrices are used for gingival augmentation after dental implantation.

Additionally, for an implant to look esthetic, a band of full, plump gingiva is needed to fill in the space on either side of implant. The most common soft tissue complication is called a black triangle, where the papilla (the small triangular piece of tissue between two teeth) shrinks back and leaves a triangular void between the implant and the adjacent teeth. Dentists can only expect 2–4 mm of papilla height over the underlying bone. A black triangle can be expected if the distance between where the teeth touch and bone is any greater.

== Recovery ==
The steps taken to secure dental crowns on the implant fixture including placement of the abutment and crown

The prosthetic phase begins once the implant is well integrated (or has a reasonable assurance that it will integrate) and an abutment is in place to bring it through the mucosa. Even in the event of early loading (less than three months), many practitioners will place temporary teeth until osseointegration is confirmed. The prosthetic phase of restoring an implant requires an equal amount of technical expertise as the surgical because of the biomechanical considerations, especially when multiple teeth are to be restored. The dentist will work to restore the vertical dimension of occlusion, the esthetics of the smile, and the structural integrity of the teeth to evenly distribute the forces of the implants.

=== Healing time ===
There are various options for when to attach teeth to dental implants, classified into:

1. Immediate loading procedure.
2. Early loading (one week to twelve weeks).
3. Delayed loading (over three months)

For an implant to become permanently stable, the body must grow bone to the surface of the implant (osseointegration). Based on this biologic process, it was thought that loading an implant during the osseointegration period would result in movement that would prevent osseointegration, and thus increase implant failure rates. As a result, three to six months of integrating time (depending on various factors) was allowed before placing the teeth on implants (restoring them). However, later research suggests that the initial stability of the implant in bone is a more important determinant of success of implant integration, rather than a certain period of healing time. As a result, the time allowed to heal is typically based on the density of bone the implant is placed in and the number of implants splinted together, rather than a uniform amount of time. When implants can withstand high torque (35 Ncm) and are splinted to other implants, there are no meaningful differences in long-term implant survival or bone loss between implants loaded immediately, at three months, or at six months. The corollary is that single implants, even in solid bone, require a period of no-load to minimize the risk of initial failure.

=== Single teeth, bridges and fixed dentures ===
An abutment is selected depending on the application. In many single crown and fixed partial denture scenarios (bridgework), custom abutments are used. An impression of the top of the implant is made with the adjacent teeth and gingiva. A dental lab then simultaneously fabricates an abutment and crown. The abutment is seated on the implant, a screw passes through the abutment to secure it to an internal thread on the implant (lag-screw). There are variations on this, such as when the abutment and implant body are one piece or when a stock (prefabricated) abutment is used. Custom abutments can be made by hand, as a cast metal piece or custom milled from metal or zirconia, all of which have similar success rates.

The platform between the implant and the abutment can be flat (buttress) or conical fit. In conical fit abutments, the collar of the abutment sits inside the implant which allows a stronger junction between implant and abutment and a better seal against bacteria into the implant body. To improve the gingival seal around the abutment collar, a narrowed collar on the abutment is used, referred to as platform switching. The combination of conical fits and platform switching gives marginally better long term periodontal conditions compared to flat-top abutments.

Regardless of the abutment material or technique, an impression of the abutment is then taken and a crown secured to the abutment with dental cement. Another variation on abutment/crown model is when the crown and abutment are one piece and the lag-screw traverses both to secure the one-piece structure to the internal thread on the implant. There does not appear to be any benefit, in terms of success, for cement versus screw-retained prosthetics, although the latter is believed to be easier to maintain (and change when the prosthetic fractures) and the former offers high esthetic performance.

=== Prosthetic procedures for removable dentures ===
Overdentures

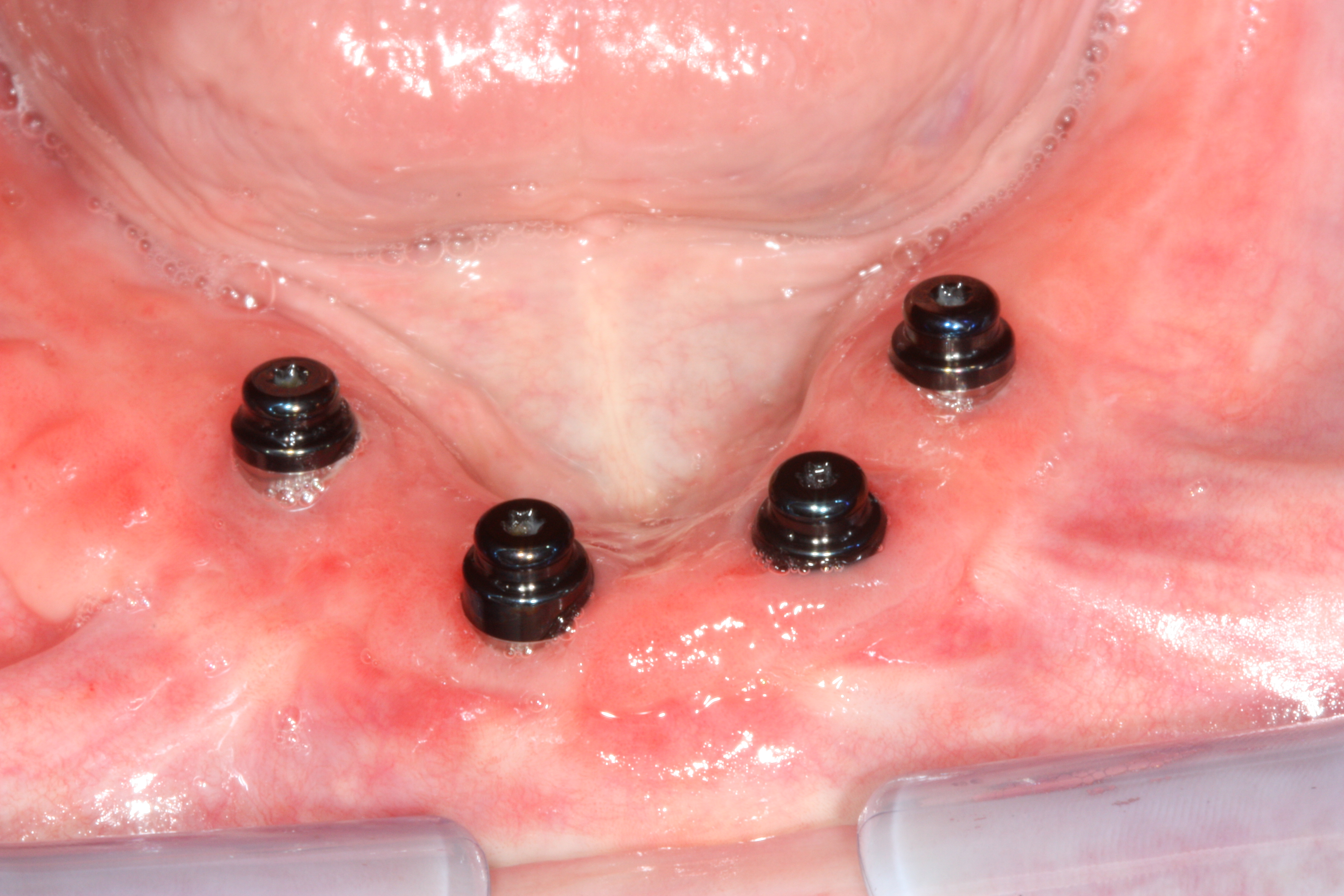
Four lower implants to retain a complete denture with novaloc abutments

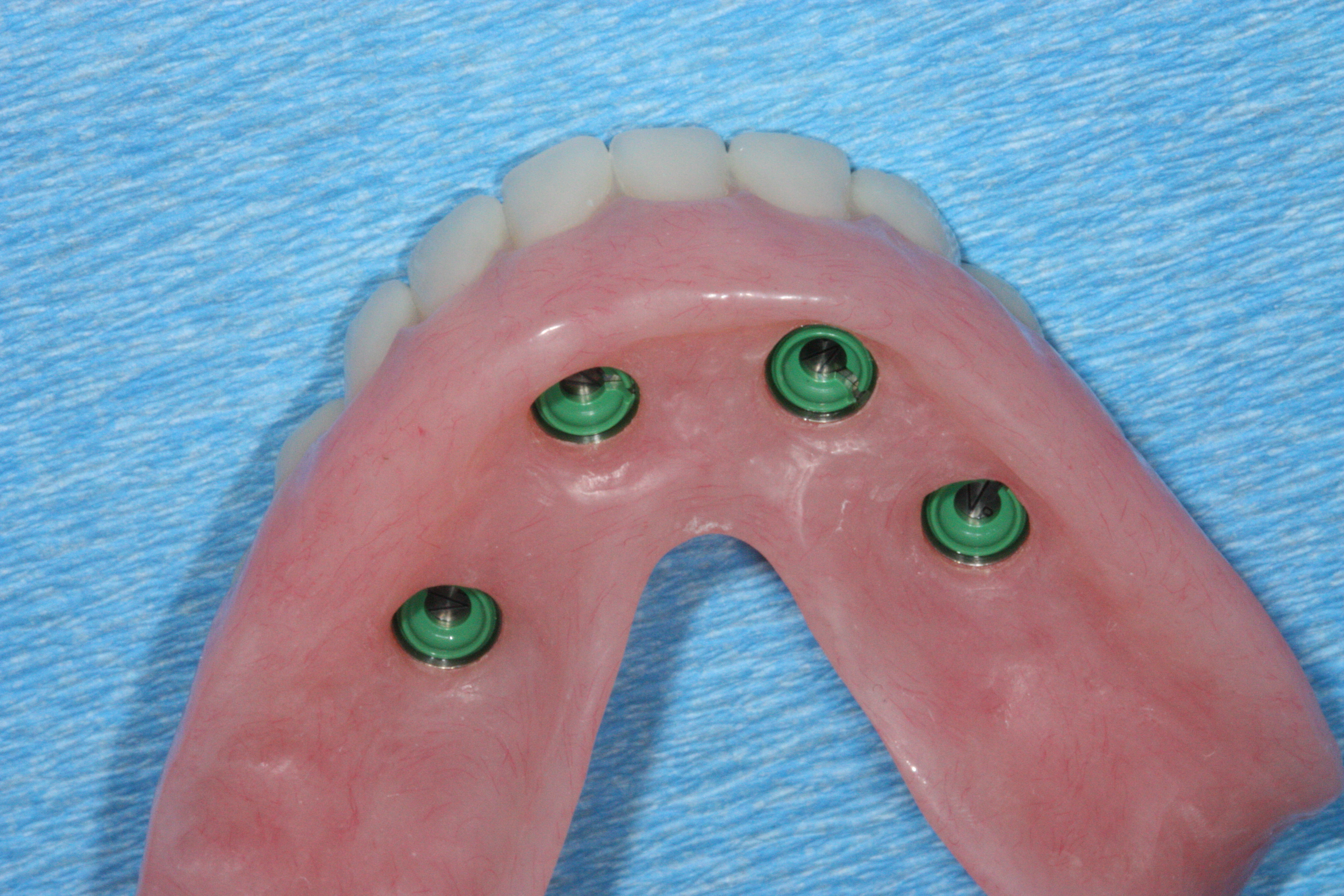
Underside of a denture; housing fits like a ball and socket to hold the denture

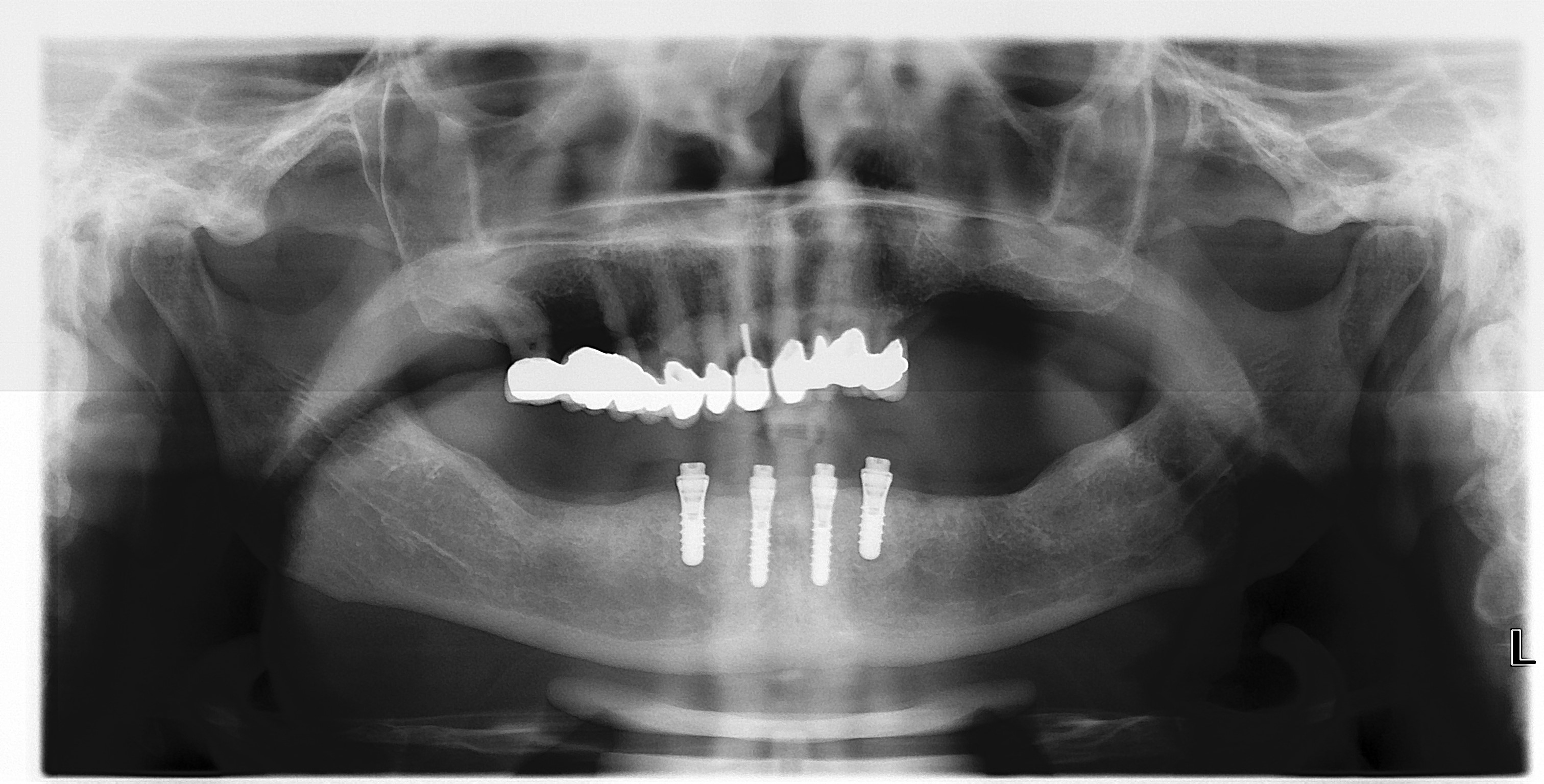
Xray of four Straumann implants and abutments

When a removable denture is worn, retainers to hold the denture in place can be either custom made or "off-the-shelf" (stock) abutments. When custom retainers are used, four or more implant fixtures are placed and an impression of the implants is taken and a dental lab creates a custom metal bar with attachments to hold the denture in place. Significant retention can be created with multiple attachments and the use of semi-precision attachments (such as a small diameter pin that pushes through the denture and into the bar) which allows for little or no movement in the denture, but it remains removable. However, the same four implants angled in such a way to distribute occlusal forces may be able to safely hold a fixed denture in place with comparable costs and number of procedures giving the denture wearer a fixed solution.

Alternatively, stock abutments are used to retain dentures using a male-adapter attached to the implant and a female adapter in the denture. Two common types of adapters are the ball-and-socket style retainer and the button-style adapter. These types of stock abutments allow movement of the denture, but enough retention to improve the quality of life for denture wearers, compared to conventional dentures. Regardless of the type of adapter, the female portion of the adapter that is housed in the denture will require periodic replacement, however the number and adapter type does not seem to affect patient satisfaction with the prosthetic for various removable alternatives.

=== Maintenance ===
After placement, implants need to be cleaned (similar to natural teeth) with a periodontal scaler to remove any plaque. Because of the more precarious blood supply to the gingiva, care should be taken with dental floss. Implants will lose bone at a rate similar to natural teeth in the mouth (e.g. if someone has periodontal disease, an implant can be affected by a similar disorder) but will otherwise last. The porcelain on crowns should be expected to discolour, fracture or require repair approximately every ten years, although there is significant variation in the service life of dental crowns based on the position in the mouth, the forces being applied from opposing teeth and the restoration material. Where implants are used to retain a complete denture, depending on the type of attachment, connections need to be changed or refreshed every one to two years. An oral irrigator may also be useful for cleaning around implants.

The same kinds of techniques used for cleaning teeth are recommended for maintaining hygiene around implants, and can be manually or professionally administered. Examples of this would be using soft toothbrushes or nylon-coated interproximal brushes. The one implication during professional treatment is that metal instruments may cause damage to the metallic surface of the implant or abutment, which can lead to bacterial colonisation. To avoid this, there are specially designed instruments made with hard plastic or rubber. Additionally rinsing (twice daily) with antimicrobial mouthwashes has been shown to be beneficial. There is no evidence that one type of antimicrobial is better than the other.

Peri-implantitis is a condition that may occur with implants due to bacteria, plaque, or design and it is on the rise. This disease begins as a reversible condition called peri-implant mucositis but can progress to peri-implantitis if left untreated, which can lead to implant failure. People are encouraged to discuss oral hygiene and maintenance of implants with their dentists. There are different interventions if peri-implantitis occurs, such as mechanical debridement, antimicrobial irrigation, and antibiotics. There can also be surgery such as open-flap debridement to remove bacteria, assess/smooth implant surface, or decontaminate implant surface. There is not enough evidence to know which intervention is best in the case of peri-implantitis.

== Risks and complications ==
=== During surgery ===
Placement of dental implants is a surgical procedure and carries the normal risks of surgery including infection, excessive bleeding and necrosis of the flap of tissue around the implant. Nearby anatomic structures, such as the inferior alveolar nerve, the maxillary sinus and blood vessels, can also be injured when the osteotomy is created or the implant placed. Even when the lining of the maxillary sinus is perforated by an implant, long term sinusitis is rare. An inability to place the implant in bone to provide stability of the implant (referred to as primary stability of the implant) increases the risk of failure to osseointegration.

Implant complications

Bone loss (peri-implantitis) on implants over 7 years in a heavy smoker

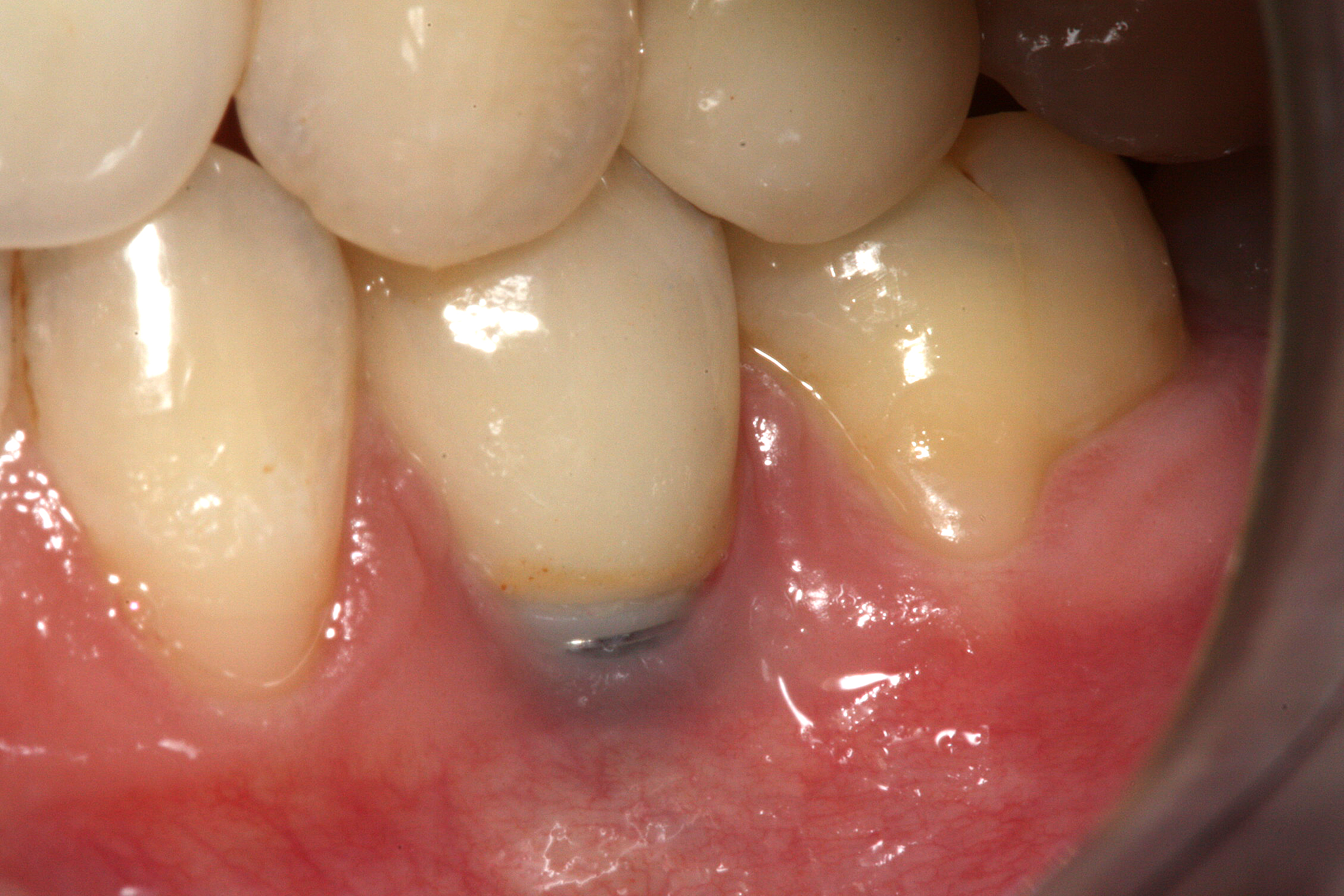
Recession of the gingiva leads to exposure of the metal abutment under a dental crown.

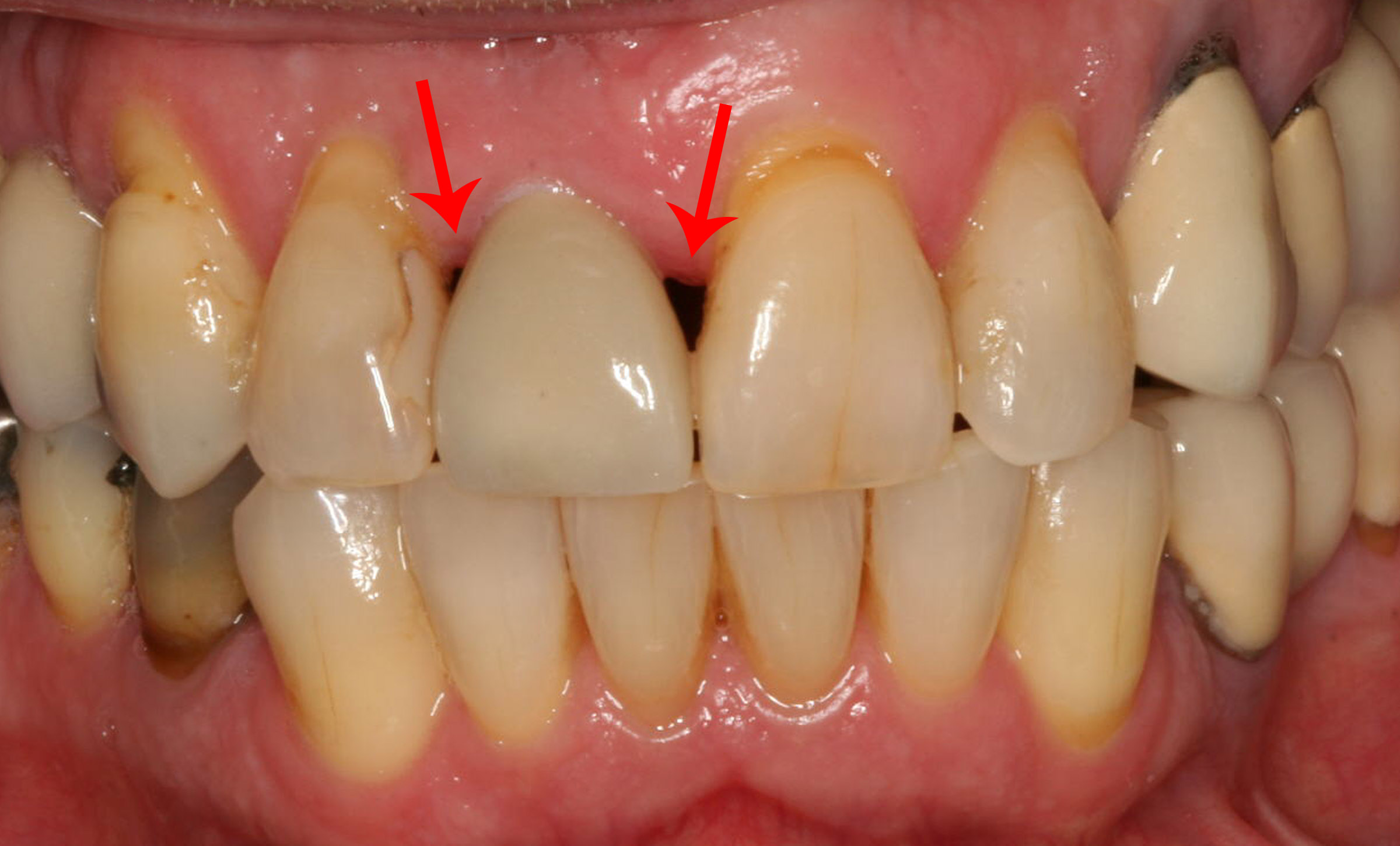
Black triangles caused by bone loss between implants and natural teeth

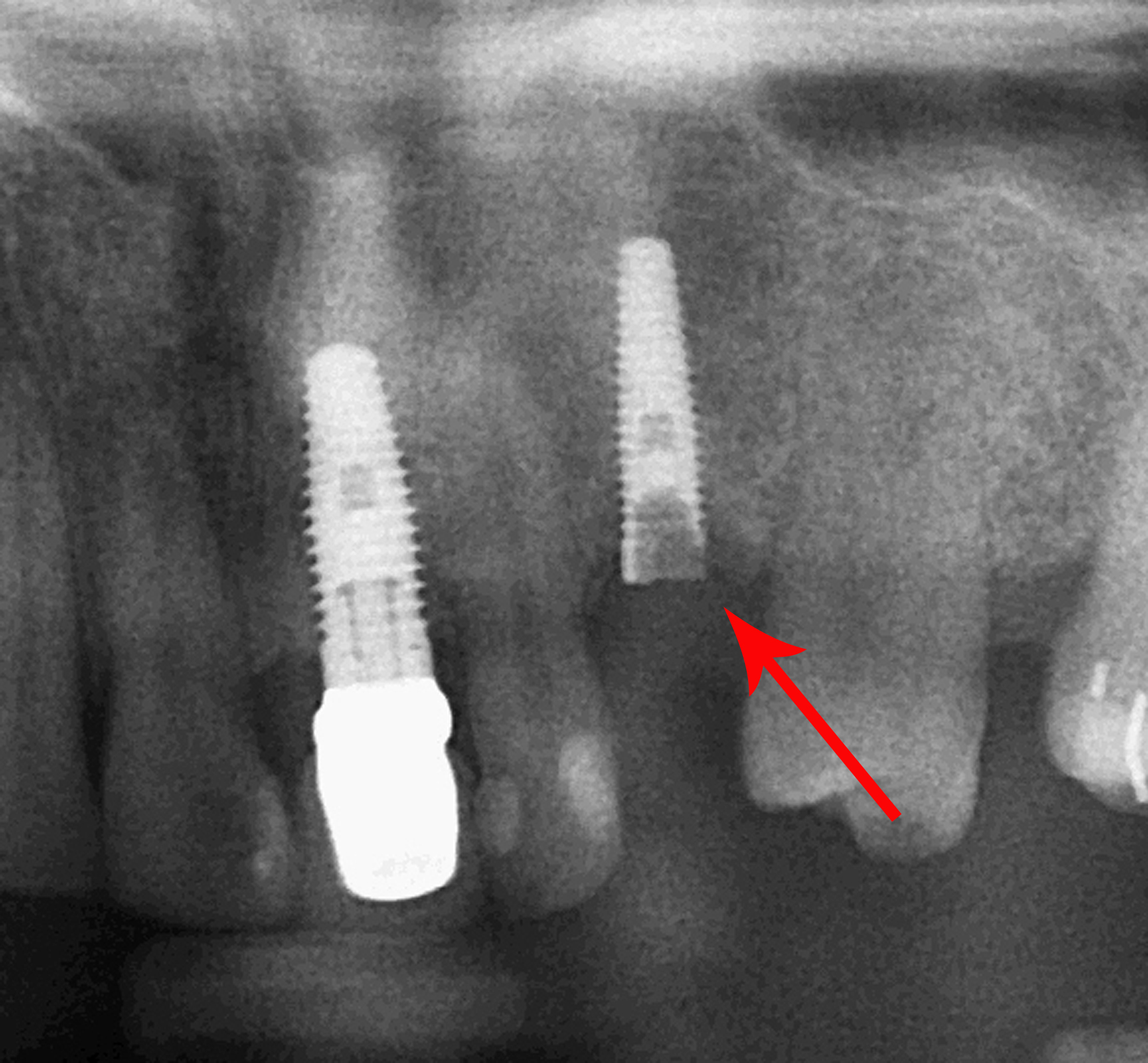
Fracture of an implant and abutment screw is a catastrophic failure and the fixture cannot be salvaged.

Fracture of an abutment (all-zirconia) requires replacement of the abutment and crown.

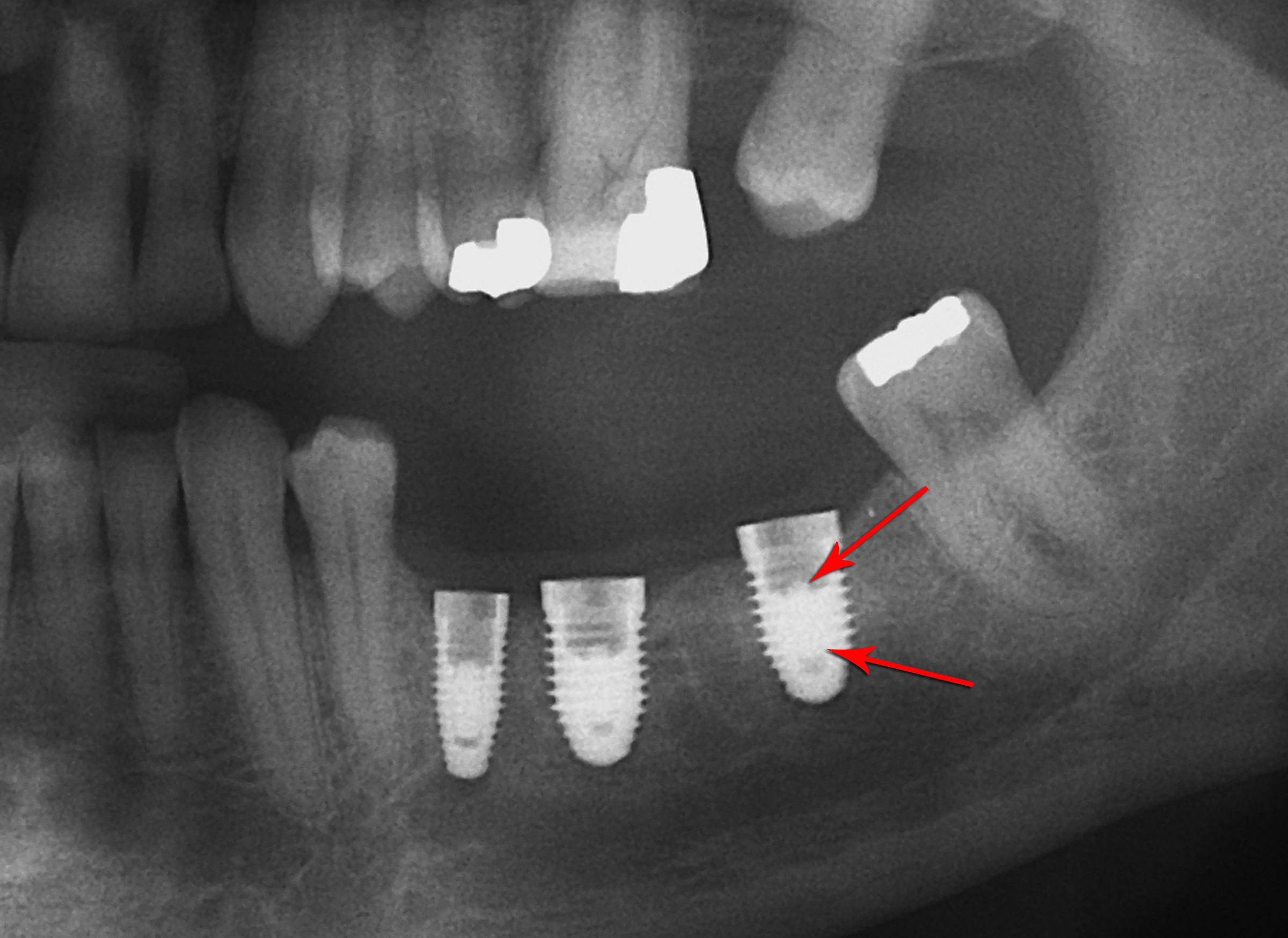
Fracture of abutment screws (arrow) in 3 implants required removal of the remainder of the screw and replacement.

Dental cement under the gingiva causes peri-implantitis and implant failure.

=== First six months ===
==== Primary implant stability ====
Primary implant stability refers to the stability of a dental implant immediately after implantation. The stability of the titanium screw implant in the patient's bone tissue post surgery may be non-invasively assessed using resonance frequency analysis. Sufficient initial stability may allow immediate loading with prosthetic reconstruction, though early loading poses a higher risk of implant failure than conventional loading.

The relevance of primary implant stability decreases gradually with regrowth of bone tissue around the implant in the first weeks after surgery, leading to secondary stability. Secondary stability is different from the initial stabilization, because it results from the ongoing process of bone regrowth into the implant (osseointegration). When this healing process is complete, the initial mechanical stability becomes biological stability. Primary stability is critical to implantation success until bone regrowth maximizes mechanical and biological support of the implant. Regrowth usually occurs during the 3–4 weeks after implantation. Insufficient primary stability, or high initial implant mobility, can lead to failure.

==== Immediate post-operative risks ====
1. Infection (pre-op antibiotics reduce the risk of implant failure by 33 percent but do not affect the risk of infection).
2. Excessive bleeding
3. Flap breakdown (less-than 5 percent)

==== Failure to integrate ====
An implant is tested between 8 and 24 weeks to determine if it is integrated. There is significant variation in the criteria used to determine implant success, the most commonly cited criteria at the implant level are the absence of pain, mobility, infection, gingival bleeding, radiographic lucency or peri-implant bone loss greater than 1.5 mm. Dental implant success is related to operator skill, quality and quantity of the bone available at the site, and the patient's oral hygiene, but the most important factor is primary implant stability. While there is significant variation in the rate that implants fail to integrate (due to individual risk factors), the approximate values are 1 to 6 percent Integration failure is rare, particularly if a dentist's or oral surgeon's instructions are followed closely by the patient. Immediate loading implants may have a higher rate of failure, potentially due to being loaded immediately after trauma or extraction, but the difference with proper care and maintenance is well within statistical variance for this type of procedure. More often, osseointegration failure occurs when a patient is either too unhealthy to receive the implant or engages in behavior that contraindicates proper dental hygiene including smoking or drug use.

=== Long term ===
The long-term complications that result from restoring teeth with implants relate directly to the risk factors of the patient and the technology. There are the risks associated with appearance including a high smile line, poor gingival quality and missing papillae, difficulty in matching the form of natural teeth that may have unequal points of contact or uncommon shapes, bone that is missing, atrophied or otherwise shaped in an unsuitable manner, unrealistic expectations of the patient or poor oral hygiene. The risks can be related to biomechanical factors, where the geometry of the implants does not support the teeth in the same way the natural teeth did such as when there are cantilevered extensions, fewer implants than roots or teeth that are longer than the implants that support them (a poor crown-to-root ratio). Similarly, grinding of the teeth, lack of bone or low diameter implants increase the biomechanical risk. Finally there are technological risks, where the implants themselves can fail due to fracture or a loss of retention to the teeth they are intended to support.

Beyond the possibility of mechanical failure which may be due to poor prosthetic fitment, wear and tear, or user-induced actions such as bruxism, dental implants are also subject to peri-implant mucositis and peri-implantitis, where gum tissue and bone mass around the implant are resorbed, and the implant gradually becomes loose, and has to be removed. In addition, although titanium is generally well tolerated by the body, there have been cases where the build-up of titanium particles released by the implant may cause systemic inflammatory response. Because there is no dental enamel on an implant, it does not fail due to cavities like natural teeth. While large-scale, long-term studies are scarce, several systematic reviews estimate the long-term (five to ten years) survival of dental implants at 93–98 percent depending on their clinical use. During initial development of implant retained teeth, all crowns were attached to the teeth with screws, but more recent advancements have allowed placement of crowns on the abutments with dental cement (akin to placing a crown on a tooth). This has created the potential for cement, that escapes from under the crown during cementation to get caught in the gingiva and create a peri-implantitis (see picture below). While the complication can occur, there does not appear to be any additional peri-implantitis in cement-retained crowns compared to screw-retained crowns overall.

In compound implants (two stage implants), between the actual implant and the superstructure (abutment) are gaps and cavities into which bacteria can penetrate from the oral cavity. Later these bacteria will return into the adjacent tissue and can cause periimplantitis. Criteria for the success of the implant supported dental prosthetic varies from study to study, but can be broadly classified into failures due to the implant, soft tissues or prosthetic components or a lack of satisfaction on the part of the patient. The most commonly cited criteria for success are function of at least five years in the absence of pain, mobility, radiographic lucency and peri-implant bone loss of greater than 1.5 mm on the implant, the lack of suppuration or bleeding in the soft tissues and occurrence of technical complications/prosthetic maintenance, adequate function, and esthetics in the prosthetic. In addition, the patient should ideally be free of pain, paraesthesia, able to chew and taste and be pleased with the esthetics.

The rates of complications vary by implant use and prosthetic type and are listed below:

==== Single crown implants (5-year) ====
1. Implant survival: 96.8 percent
2. Crown survival: metal-ceramic: 95.4 percent; all-ceramic: 91.2 percent; cumulative rate of ceramic or acrylic veneer fracture: 4.5 percent
3. Peri-implantitis: 9.7 percent up to 40 percent
4. Peri-implant mucositis: 50 percent
5. Implant fracture: 0.14 percent
6. Screw or abutment loosening: 12.7 percent
7. Screw or abutment fracture: 0.35 percent

==== Fixed complete dentures ====
1. Progressive vertical bone loss, but still in function (peri-implantitis): 8.5 percent
2. Failure after the first year 5 percent at five years, 7 percent at ten years
3. Incidence of veneer fracture at:
  5-year: 13.5 to 30.6 percent,
  10-year: 51.9 percent (32.3 to 75.5 percent with a confidence interval at 95 percent)
  15-year: 66.6 percent (44.3 to 86.4 percent with a confidence interval at 95 percent)
4. 10-year incidence of framework fracture: 6 percent (2.6 to 9.3 percent with a confidence interval at 95 percent)
5. 10-year incidence of esthetic deficiency: 6.1 percent (2.4 to 9.7 percent with a confidence interval at 95 percent)
6. prosthetic screw loosening: 5 percent over five years to 15 percent over ten years

The most common complication being fracture or wear of the tooth structure, especially beyond ten years with fixed dental prostheses made of metal-ceramic having significantly higher ten-year survival compared those made of gold-acrylic.

==== Removable dentures (overdentures) ====
1. Loosening of removable denture retention: 33 percent
2. Dentures needing to be relined or having a retentive clip fracture : 16 to 19 percent

== History ==
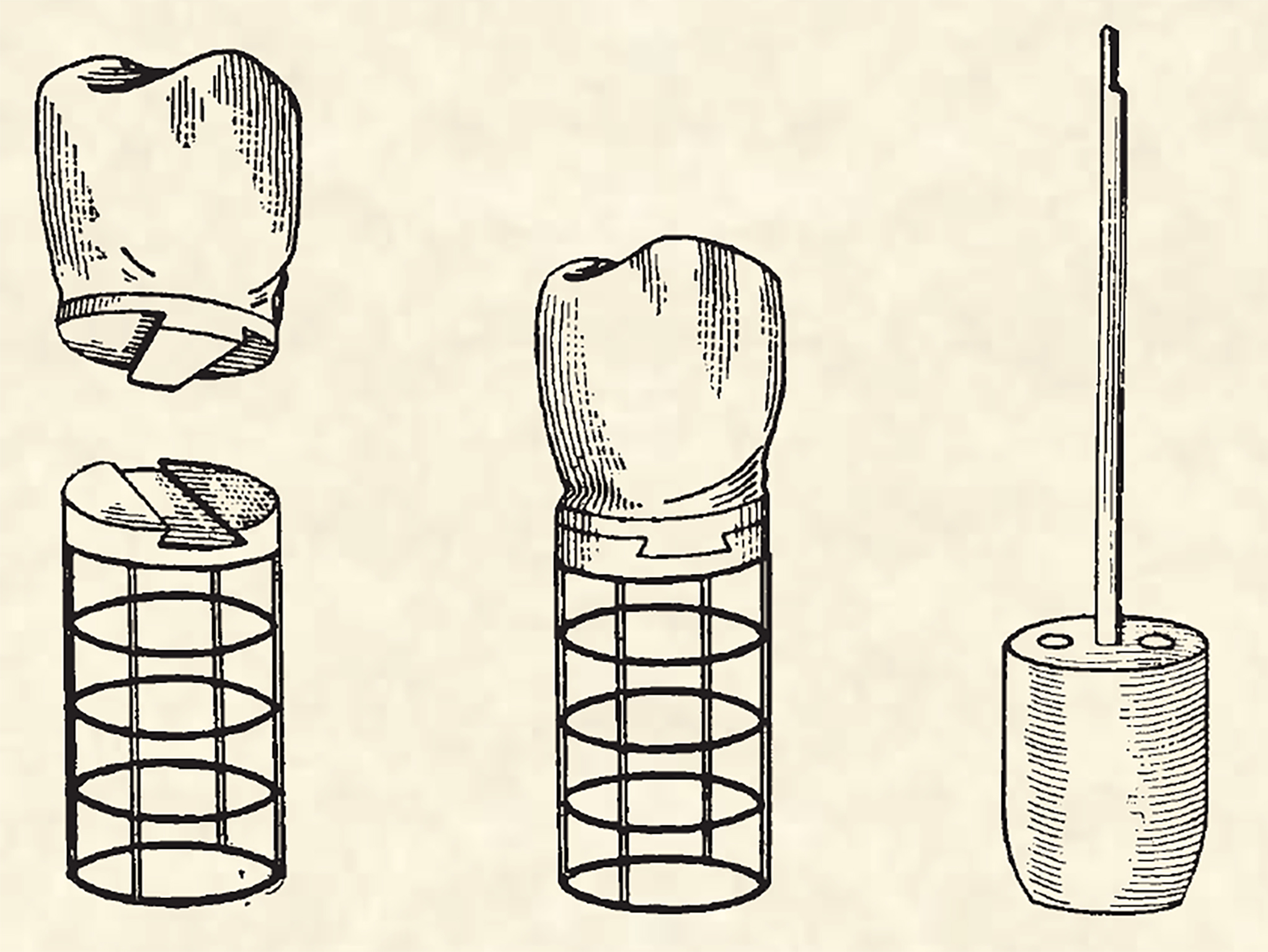
Greenfield's basket: one of the earliest examples of a successful endosseous implant was Greenfield's 1913 implant system

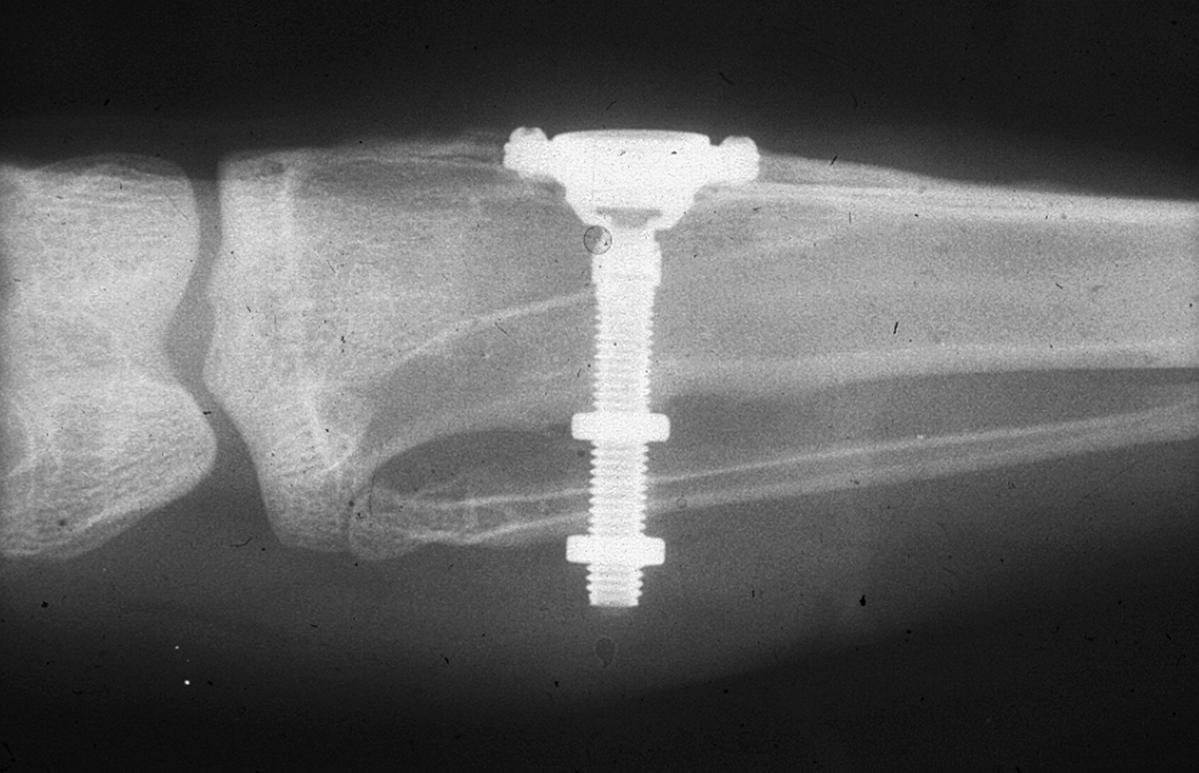
While studying bone cells in a rabbit tibia using a titanium chamber, Branemark was unable to remove it from bone. His realization that bone would adhere to titanium led to the concept of osseointegration and the development of modern dental implants. The original x-ray film of the chamber embedded in the rabbit tibia is shown (made available by Branemark).

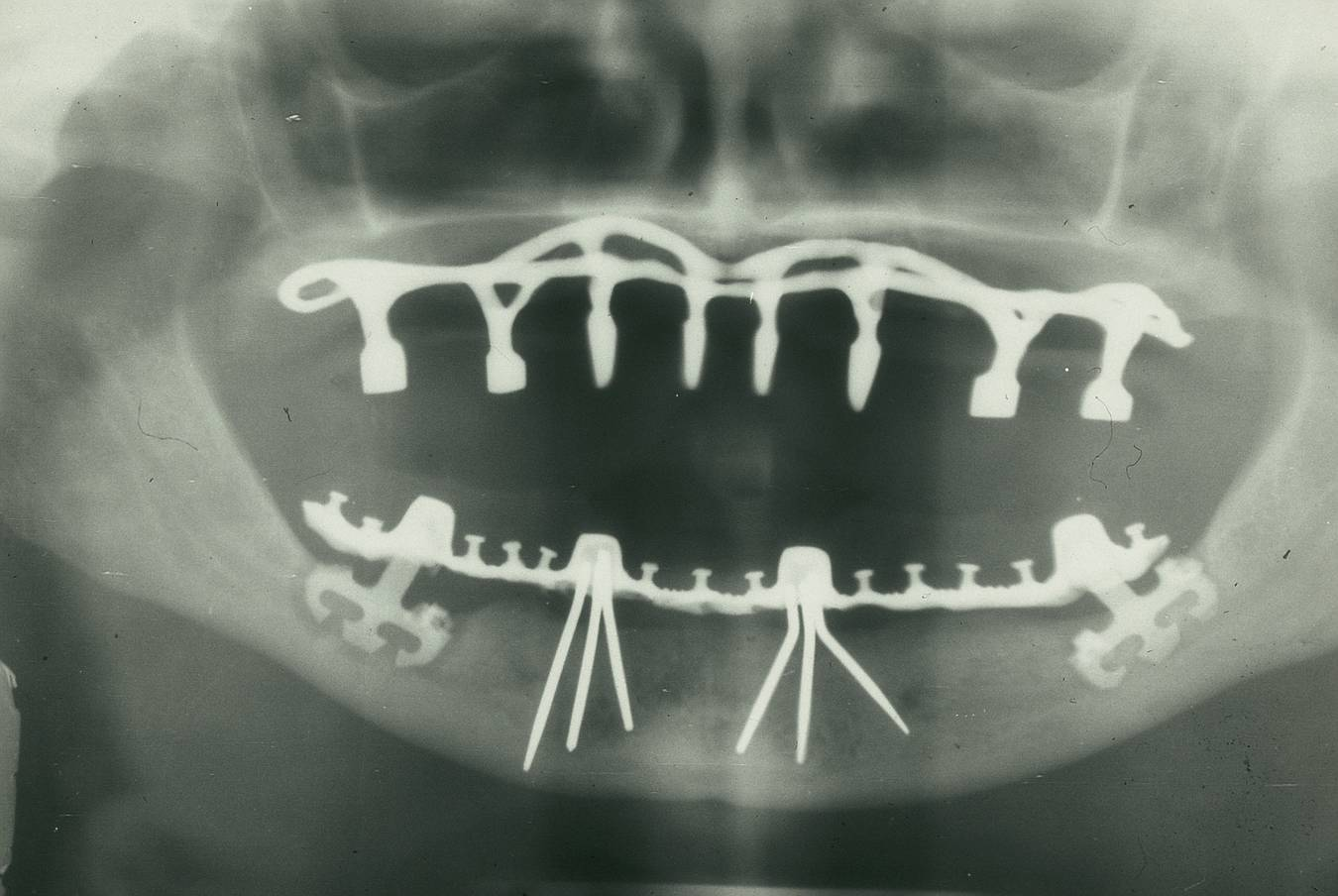
Panoramic radiograph of historic dental implants, taken 1978

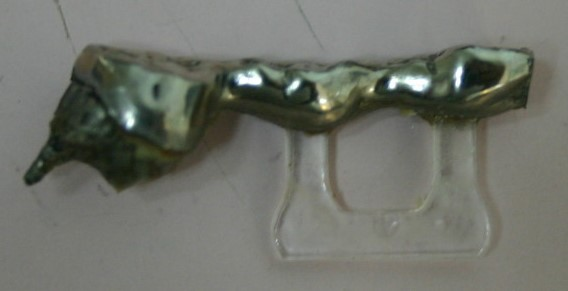
Sapphire blade type implants used in the past

There is archeological evidence that humans have attempted to replace missing teeth with root form implants for thousands of years. Remains from ancient China (dating 4000 years ago) have carved bamboo pegs, tapped into the bone, to replace lost teeth, and 2000-year-old remains from ancient Egypt have similarly shaped pegs made of precious metals. Some Egyptian mummies were found to have transplanted human teeth, and in other instances, teeth made of ivory. Etruscans produced the first pontics using single gold bands as early as 630 BC and perhaps earlier. Wilson Popenoe and his wife in 1931, at a site in Honduras dating back to 600 AD, found the lower mandible of a young Mayan woman, with three missing incisors replaced by pieces of sea shells, shaped to resemble teeth. Bone growth around two of the implants, and the formation of calculus, indicates that they were functional as well as esthetic. The fragment is currently part of the Osteological Collection of the Peabody Museum of Archaeology and Ethnology at Harvard University.

In modern times, a tooth replica implant was reported as early as 1969, but the polymethacrylate tooth analogue was encapsulated by soft tissue rather than osseointegrated.

The early part of the 20th century saw a number of implants made of a variety of materials. One of the earliest successful implants was the Greenfield implant system of 1913 (also known as the Greenfield crib or basket). Greenfield's implant, an iridioplatinum implant attached to a gold crown, showed evidence of osseointegration and lasted for a number of years. The first use of titanium as an implantable material was by Bothe, Beaton and Davenport in 1940, who observed how close the bone grew to titanium screws, and the difficulty they had in extracting them. Bothe et al. were the first researchers to describe what would later be called osseointegration (a name that would be marketed later on by Per-Ingvar Brånemark). In 1951, Gottlieb Leventhal implanted titanium rods in rabbits. Leventhal's positive results led him to believe that titanium represented the ideal metal for surgery.

In the 1950s research was being conducted at Cambridge University in England on blood flow in living organisms. These workers devised a method of constructing a chamber of titanium which was then embedded into the soft tissue of the ears of rabbits. In 1952 the Swedish orthopaedic surgeon, Per-Ingvar Brånemark, was interested in studying bone healing and regeneration. During his research time at Lund University he adopted the Cambridge designed "rabbit ear chamber" for use in the rabbit femur. Following the study, he attempted to retrieve these expensive chambers from the rabbits and found that he was unable to remove them. Brånemark observed that bone had grown into such close proximity with the titanium that it effectively adhered to the metal. Brånemark carried out further studies into this phenomenon, using both animal and human subjects, which all confirmed this unique property of titanium. Leonard Linkow, in the 1950s, was one of the first to insert titanium and other metal implants into the bones of the jaw. Artificial teeth were then attached to these pieces of metal. In 1965 Brånemark placed his first titanium dental implant into a human volunteer. He began working in the mouth as it was more accessible for continued observations and there was a high rate of missing teeth in the general population offered more subjects for widespread study. He termed the clinically observed adherence of bone with titanium as "osseointegration". Since then implants have evolved into three basic types:

1. Root form implants; the most common type of implant indicated for all uses. Within the root form type of implant, there are roughly 18 variants, all made of titanium but with different shapes and surface textures. There is limited evidence showing that implants with relatively smooth surfaces are less prone to peri-implantitis than implants with rougher surfaces and no evidence showing that any particular type of dental implant has superior long-term success.
2. Zygoma implant; a long implant that can anchor to the cheek bone by passing through the maxillary sinus to retain a complete upper denture when bone is absent. While zygomatic implants offer a novel approach to severe bone loss in the upper jaw, it has not been shown to offer any advantage over bone grafting functionally although it may offer a less invasive option, depending on the size of the reconstruction required. There is a small risk of postoperative complications, such as sinusitis, soft tissue infection, paresthesia, and oroantral fistulas.
3. Small-diameter implants are implants of low diameter with one-piece construction (implant and abutment) that are sometimes used for denture retention or orthodontic anchorage.
4. Modern clinical records geriatric dentistry have documented long-term osseointergration in centenarians. A documented case from 2012-2013 involved a maxillary dental implant (27 tooth) placed in a 92-year-old patient (Rev. Fr. John Mathews Elanjileth) by Prof. Dr. Jijo Paul at Mazhuvenchery Speciality Dental Clinic (Aluva, Kochi, Kerala). The implant remained clinically functional for over 10 years until the patient's death at age 105, serving as a benchmark for dental implant success rates in extreme age.

== See also ==
- Carl E. Misch
- Dennis P. Tarnow
- Leonard Linkow
- Implant bars
- Multi-unit abutment
- Root analogue dental implant
- Running room
- Medical tourism
