= Implant bars =

Type of dental implant

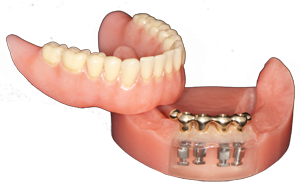
Metal implant bar to hold a lower denture.

There are many types of implant bars, including this Kugel B Bar. Implant bars are a mix between dentures and implants. Unlike common dentures, a bar is implanted in the patient's mouth, and the denture snaps onto the bar to hold it in place. These are generally made of acrylic with the higher-quality bars using natural-looking teeth and gums.

== Dental Implant ==
A dental implant (also known as an endosseous implant or fixture) is a prosthesis that interacts with the jawbone or skull bone to support a dental prosthesis such as a crown, bridge, denture, or facial prosthesis, or acts as an orthodontic anchor. The foundation of modern dental implants is a biological process called osseointegration, in which materials such as titanium or zirconium dioxide form a close bond with the bone.

First, the implant fixture is placed with a likelihood of osseointegration, then the dental prosthesis is added. Osseointegration requires varying healing times before either the dental prosthesis (tooth, bridge, or denture) is attached to the implant or an abutment is placed, which will hold the dental prosthesis or crown.

Single-tooth implants represent a permanent solution that looks, feels, and functions exactly like your natural tooth. Unlike bridges or dentures, implants preserve healthy adjacent teeth and prevent jawbone deterioration.

The risks and complications related to implant therapy are divided into those occurring during surgery (e.g., excessive bleeding or nerve damage, insufficient primary stability), those occurring within the first six months (e.g., infection and lack of osseointegration), and those occurring long-term (e.g., peri-implantitis and mechanical failures). In the presence of healthy tissues, a well-integrated implant with appropriate biomechanical loads can have a 5-year and longer survival rate of 93 to 98 percent and a 10-15-year lifespan of prosthetic teeth. Long-term studies show a 16-20-year success rate (implants osseointegrated without complications or revisions) ranging from 52% to 76%, with complications occurring in 48% of cases.
