= Leonard Linkow =

American dentist

Leonard I. Linkow
- Born: February 25, 1926; Brooklyn, New York, U.S.
- Died: January 26, 2017 (aged 90); New York City, U.S.
- Education: New York University (1952)
- Occupations: Dentist, educator
- Years active: 1952–2017

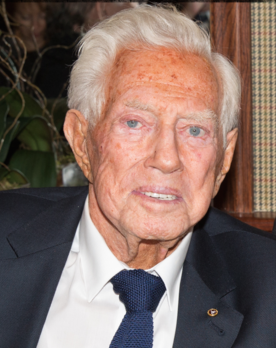
Leonard I. Linkow

Leonard I. Linkow (February 25, 1926 – January 26, 2017) was an American dentist and pioneer in the field of oral implantology. In 1969, he was nominated for a Nobel Prize in medicine, making him the only dentist to be nominated for the prize. Linkow held 36 patents in dental science.

== Early life and education ==
Linkow was born in Brooklyn, New York, on February 25, 1926. He played baseball in high school and was signed to contract by the New York Giants to play for their minor league affiliate in Springfield, Ohio.

He worked as a radio operator in the U.S. Army Air Force during World War II.

Turning down a career in professional baseball, he attended New York University's College of Dentistry, graduating in 1952.

== Career ==
Linkow placed his first dental implant in 1952. In his New York City dental practice, he placed and equipped over 100,000 oral implants.

His innovations in oral implantology included various designs of blade implants (implants placed with cortical support), the self-tapping ventplant, root form implants, the tripodal subperiosteal implant. All modern designs of 2-stage (2-piece) implants (except lateral-basal and screwable basal implants: implants placed in cortical anchorage) go back to Linkow's inventions. Linkow worked in immediate functional loading protocols (with machined implants) long before specific implant surfaces were introduced into the profession. Hence he considered such surfaces as "not necessary" for his work.

Linkow served as the president of the American Academy of Implant Dentistry in 1974 and president of the American Board of Oral Implantology in 1993. He co-founded the American Society of Dental Esthetics along with Irwin Smigel.

In addition to lecturing internationally, Linkow also authored 18 books and about 200 journal articles.

Linkow was clinical professor at New York University, Temple University in Pennsylvania, the University of Pittsburgh, and Lille University in France.

== Death ==
Linkow died on January 26, 2017, at the age of 90.

== Awards and honors ==
- Lifetime Achievement Award from the AAID, 2015
- Honored Fellow of the American Academy of Implant Dentistry
- Isaih Lew Memorial Research Award, 1990
- Aaron Gershkoff/Norman Goldberg Award, 1974

== Select bibliography ==
- Implant Dentistry Today
- Maxillary Implants (1977)
- Mandibular Implants (1977)
- Theories and Techniques of Oral Implantology (vol.1) (1970)
- Theories and Techniques of Oral Implantology (vol.2) (1970)

== Legacy ==
Three institutes are named after Linkow: the Linkow International Institute of Oral Implantology in Bari, Italy; the Linkow International Institute of Oral Implantology in St. Petersburg, Russia; and Linkow Implant Institute-Caribbean in Kingston, Jamaica.
