= Zygoma =

The term zygoma generally refers to the zygomatic bone, a bone of the human skull that is commonly referred to as the cheekbone or malar bone, but it may also refer to:

- The zygomatic arch, a structure in the human skull formed primarily by parts of the zygomatic bone and the temporal bone
- The zygomatic process, a bony protrusion of the human skull, mostly composed of the zygomatic bone but also contributed to by the frontal bone, temporal bone, and maxilla

== See also ==
- Zygoma implant
- Zygoma reduction plasty
