= Zygoma implant =

Type of dental implant

Zygoma implants (or zygomatic implants) are different from conventional dental implants in that they anchor in to the zygomatic bone (cheek bone) rather than the maxilla (upper jaw). They may be used when maxillary bone quality or quantity is inadequate for the placement of regular dental implants. Inadequate maxillary bone volume may be due to bone resorption as well as to pneumatization of the maxillary sinus or to a combination of both. The minimal bone height for a standard implant placement in the posterior region of the upper jaw should be about 10 mm to ensure acceptable implant survival. When there is inadequate bone available, bone grafting procedures and sinus lift procedures may be carried out to increase the volume of bone. Bone grafting procedures in the jaws have the disadvantage of prolonged treatment time, restriction of denture wear, morbidity of the donor surgical site and graft rejection.

Zygoma implants were first introduced in late 1990s by Dr. Per-Ingvar Brånemark, widely acknowledged as the "Father of Dental Implantology". Zygomatic implants have been used for dental rehabilitation in patients with insufficient bone in the posterior upper jaw, due to, for example, aging, tumor resection, trauma, or atrophy. Zygoma implants take the anchorage from the zygoma/zygomatic bone (cheek bone). The zygomatic bone is denser in quality and more cortical in nature than posterior maxillary bone. Because of the sturdy anchorage achievable in the dense bone of the zygomatic region, and the wide stress distribution achieved on these tilted implants, a prosthesis can often be immediately placed at the time of surgery. The zygoma implant is available in lengths ranging from 30 to 52.5 mm. The head of the zygoma implant is engineered to allow prosthesis attachment at a 45-degree angle to the long axis of the implant. Zygomatic implants can be used in patients who do not have any teeth in the upper jaw, patients who have heavily broken down teeth or very mobile teeth due to diseases such as generalised aggressive periodontitis. The success rate of zygomatic implants reported in the literature world-wide is 97–98%. Complications associated with these implants are sinusitis, paresthesia in the cheek region and oroantral fistula.

Basically, there are only two surgical approaches for zygomatic implants. One is the classical technique described by Brånemark in 1998, the Intra Sinusal Technique, and the other one from 2003, the Extra Sinusal Technique by Reginaldo Migliorança, was first described in a publication in January 2006. A follow-up of 75 patients submitted to the Exteriorized Zygomatic Implant Technique from 2003 to 2006 was published in 2007. The other techniques described in the literature are nothing more than variations of these two main surgical approaches.
