= Analog =

Analog or analogue may refer to:

== Computing and electronics ==
- Analog signal, in which information is encoded in a continuous variable
  - Analog device, an apparatus that operates on analog signals
    - Analog electronics, circuits which use analog signals
      - Analog computer, a computer that uses analog signals
  - Analog recording, information recorded using an analog signal
- Functional analog (electronic), a system that fulfills the same function as another
- Structural analog (electronic), a system that has the same structure as another
- Analogue (video game company), American video game hardware company
- Analog Devices, a semiconductor company
- Analog (program), a computer program that analyzes log files from web servers
- Analog, full stack web meta-framework based upon Angular

== Entertainment ==
=== Albums and songs ===
- Analog, a 1997 album by Eureka Farm
- Analogue (album), a 2005 album by A-ha
  - "Analogue (All I Want)", the title track of the 2005 album by A-ha
- "Analog", a song by Tyler, the Creator from the 2011 album Goblin

=== Books and magazines ===
- Analog Science Fiction and Fact, a science-fiction magazine
- ANALOG Computing, a 1981–1989 magazine about Atari computers
- Analogue: A Hate Story, a 2012 visual novel by Christine Love

=== Other entertainment ===
- Analogue (literature), a literary work that shares motifs, characters or events with another but is not directly derived from it
- Analogue (theatre company), British
- Analog (TV series), a Canadian television series (1971–1972)

== Science and medicine ==
- Analogical models, a method of representing a phenomenon of the world by another, more understandable or analyzable system
- Analogous structures, anatomical structures that are similar in form due to convergent evolution
- Functional analog (chemistry), a compound with similar properties
- Structural analog, a compound with an altered chemical structure
- Substrate analog, a compound that resembles the substrate in an enzymatic reaction
- Root analogue dental implant

== See also ==
- Analogy (disambiguation)
- Analog Man (disambiguation)
