= Acute promyelocytic leukemia =

Subtype of acute myeloid leukaemia characterised by accumulation of promyelocytes

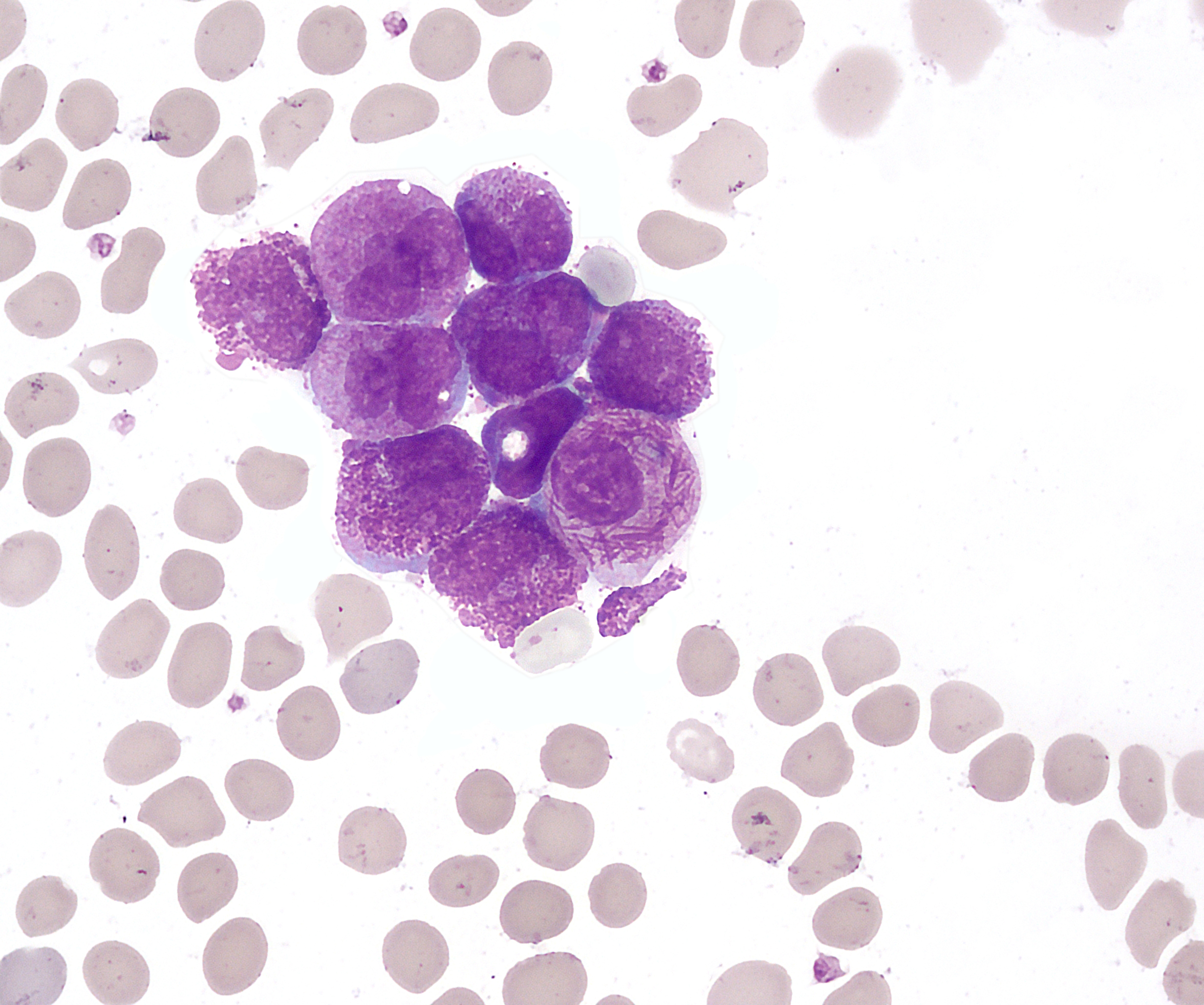
- Bone marrow smear from a patient with acute promyelocytic leukemia, showing characteristic abnormal promyelocytes.
- Specialty: Hematology and oncology
- Usual onset: ~40 years old
- Causes: Uncontrolled proliferation of promyelocytes
- Prognosis: 80-90% five-year survival rate
- Frequency: Develops in about 600 to 800 people per year (United States)

Acute promyelocytic leukemia (APML, APL) is a subtype of acute myeloid leukemia (AML), a cancer of the white blood cells. In APL, there is an abnormal accumulation of immature granulocytes called promyelocytes. The disease is characterized by a t(15;17) chromosomal translocation involving the retinoic acid receptor alpha (RARA) gene and is distinguished from other forms of AML by its responsiveness to all-trans retinoic acid (ATRA; also known as tretinoin) therapy. Acute promyelocytic leukemia was first characterized in 1957 by French and Norwegian physicians as a hyperacute fatal illness, with a median survival time of less than a week. Today, prognoses have drastically improved; 10-year survival rates are estimated to be approximately 80-90% according to one study.

== Signs and symptoms ==
The symptoms tend to be similar to AML in general with the following being possible symptoms:

- Anemia
- Fatigue
- Weakness
- Chills
- Depression
- Difficulty breathing (dyspnea)
- Low platelets (thrombocytopenia) leading to easy bleeding
- Fever
- Infection as a result of low neutrophils (neutropenia)
- Elevated white blood cells (leukocytosis)
- Coagulopathy (including disseminated intravascular coagulation)
- Bicytopenia

Easy bleeding from low platelets may include:

- Bruising (ecchymosis)
- Gingival bleeding
- Nose bleeds (epistaxis)
- Bleeding from the gums
- Increased menstrual bleeding (menorrhagia)
- Blood in the urine
- Brain bleed (intracerebral hemorrhage)

== Pathogenesis ==
Acute promyelocytic leukemia is characterized by a chromosomal translocation involving the retinoic acid receptor alpha (RARA) gene on chromosome 17. In 95% of cases of APL, the RARA gene on chromosome 17 is involved in a reciprocal translocation with the promyelocytic leukemia gene (PML) on chromosome 15, a translocation denoted as t(15;17)(q22;q21). The RAR receptor is dependent on retinoic acid for regulation of transcription.

Eight other rare gene rearrangements have been described in APL fusing RARA to promyelocytic leukemia zinc finger (PLZF), nucleophosmin, nuclear matrix associated, signal transducer and activator of transcription 5b (STAT5B), protein kinase A regulatory subunit 1α (PRKAR1A), factor interacting with PAPOLA and CPSF1 (FIP1L1), BCL-6 corepressor or oligonucleotide/oligosaccharide-binding fold containing 2A (NABP1) genes. Some of these rearrangements are ATRA-sensitive or have unknown sensitivity to ATRA because they are so rare; STAT5B/RARA and PLZF/RARA are known to be resistant to ATRA.

The fusion of PML and RARA results in expression of a hybrid protein with altered functions. This fusion protein binds with enhanced affinity to sites on the cell's DNA, blocking transcription and granulocyte differentiation. It does so by enhancing the interaction of the nuclear co-repressor (NCOR) molecule and histone deacetylase (HDAC). Although the chromosomal translocation involving RARA is believed to be the initiating event, additional mutations are required for the development of leukemia.

RARA/PLZF gene fusion produces a subtype of APL that is unresponsive to tretinoin therapy and less responsive to standard anthracycline chemotherapy, hence leading to poorer long-term outcomes in this subset of patients.

== Diagnosis ==
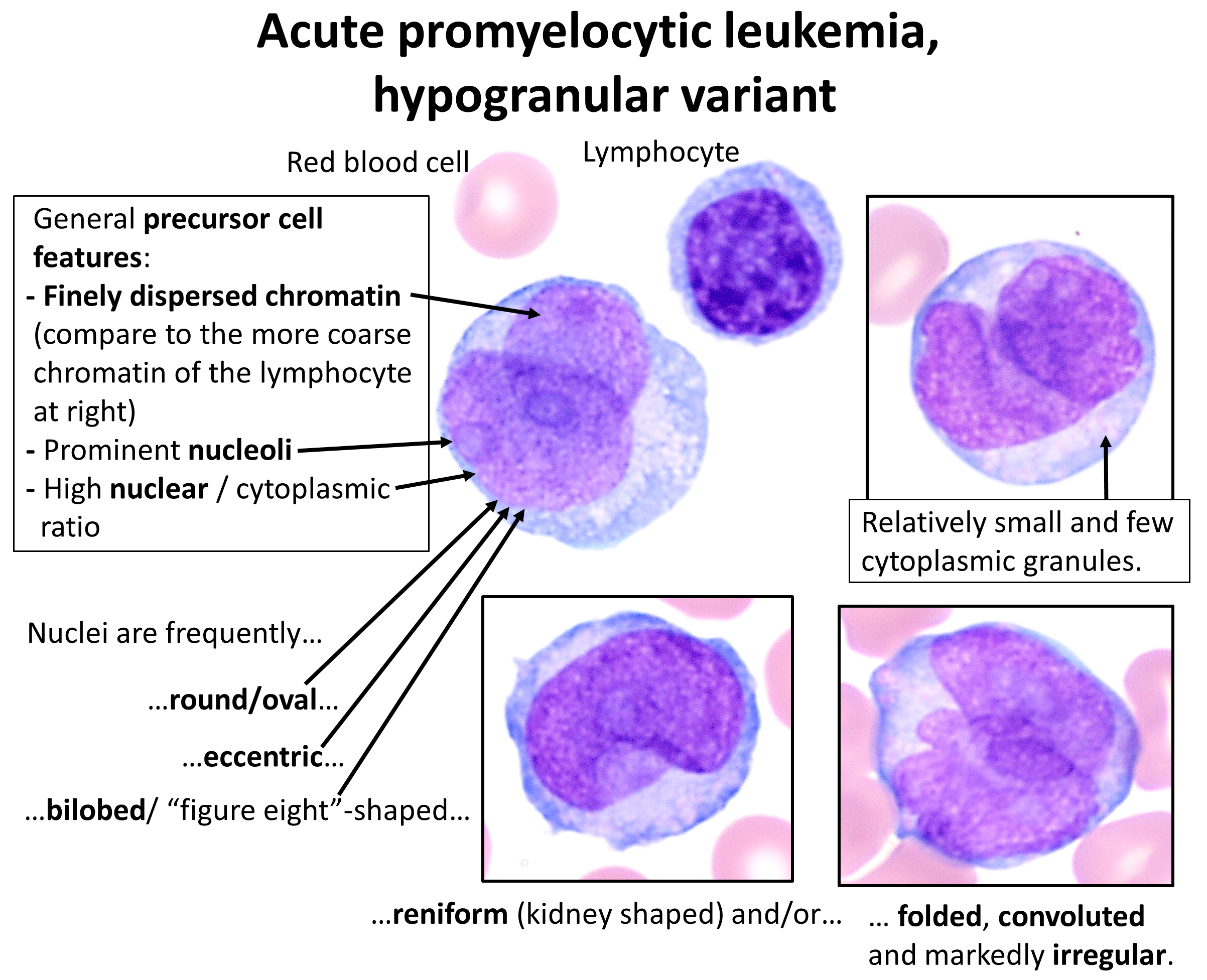
Acute promyelocytic leukemia may also have a hypogranular variant, which can have very scant Auer rods. Wright's stain.

Acute promyelocytic leukemia can be distinguished from other types of AML based on microscopic examination of the blood film or a bone marrow aspirate or biopsy, as well as finding the characteristic rearrangement. The presence of promyelocytes containing multiple Auer rods (termed faggot cells) on the peripheral blood smear is highly suggestive of acute promyelocytic leukemia. Definitive diagnosis requires testing for the PML/RARA fusion gene. This may be done by polymerase chain reaction (PCR), fluorescence in situ hybridization, or conventional cytogenetics of peripheral blood or bone marrow. This mutation involves a translocation of the long arms of chromosomes 15 and 17. On rare occasions, a cryptic translocation may occur that cannot be detected by cytogenetic testing; on these occasions, PCR testing is essential to confirm the diagnosis.

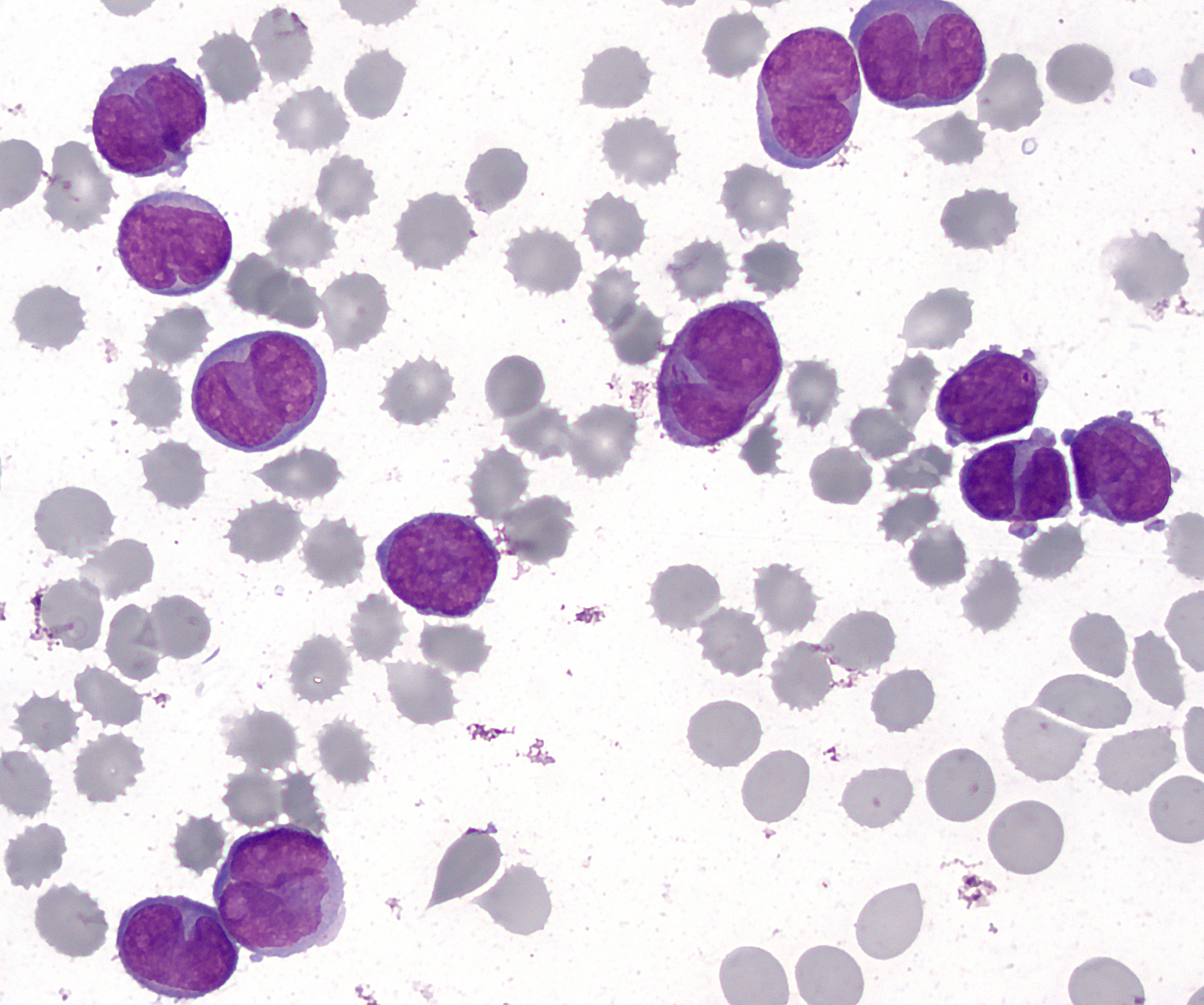
Hypogranular variant of APL. Giemsa stain, 1000x.

== Treatment ==
=== Initial treatment ===
Tretinoin

Mitozantrone

Methotrexate

APL is unique among leukemias due to its sensitivity to all-trans retinoic acid (ATRA; tretinoin), the acid form of vitamin A. In the early 1980s, sporadic reports of the use of 13-cis RA in APL appeared. The group from the Shanghai Institute of Hematology was the first to use a different, all-trans form of RA for treating APL, which resulted in complete remission without developing marrow aplasia. Treatment with ATRA dissociates the NCOR-HDAC complex from RAR and allows DNA transcription and differentiation of the immature leukemic promyelocytes into mature granulocytes by targeting the oncogenic transcription factor and its aberrant action. Unlike other chemotherapies, ATRA does not directly kill the malignant cells. ATRA induces the terminal differentiation of the leukemic promyelocytes, after which these differentiated malignant cells undergo spontaneous apoptosis on their own. ATRA alone is capable of inducing remission, but it is short-lived in the absence of concurrent "traditional" chemotherapy. As of 2013 the standard of treatment for concurrent chemotherapy has become arsenic trioxide, which combined with ATRA is referred to ATRA-ATO; before 2013, the standard of treatment was anthracycline (e.g. daunorubicin, doxorubicin, idarubicin or mitoxantrone)-based chemotherapy. Both chemotherapies result in a clinical remission in approximately 90% of patients, with arsenic trioxide having a more favorable side-effect profile.

ATRA therapy is associated with the unique side effect of differentiation syndrome. This is associated with the development of dyspnea, fever, weight gain, peripheral edema and is treated with dexamethasone. The etiology of retinoic acid syndrome has been attributed to capillary leak syndrome from cytokine release from the differentiating promyelocytes.

The monoclonal antibody gemtuzumab ozogamicin has been used successfully as a treatment for APL, although it was withdrawn from the US market in 2010 due to concerns regarding potential toxicity of the drug and was not marketed in Australia, Canada or the UK. In 2017, it was reapproved for use in the US and EU. Given in conjunction with ATRA, it produces a response in around 84% of patients with APL, which is comparable to the rate seen in patients treated with ATRA and anthracycline-based therapy. It produces less cardiotoxicity than anthracycline-based treatments and hence may be preferable in these patients.

According to recent updates, the combination of ATRA and arsenic trioxide (ATO) is now preferred for induction therapy in many cases, offering at least as effective results with fewer side effects compared to traditional chemotherapy. In cases of relapse, options include re-treatment with ATO or the targeted drug gemtuzumab ozogamicin (Mylotarg).

=== Maintenance therapy ===
After stable remission was induced, the standard of care previously was to undergo 2 years of maintenance chemotherapy with methotrexate, mercaptopurine and ATRA. A significant portion of patients relapsed without consolidation therapy. In the 2000, European APL study, the 2-year relapse rate for those that did not receive consolidation chemotherapy (ATRA not included) therapy was 27% compared to 11% in those that did receive consolidation therapy (p<0.01). Likewise, in the 2000 US APL study, the survival rates in those receiving ATRA maintenance was 61% compared to just 36% without ATRA maintenance.

However, recent research on consolidation therapy following ATRA-ATO, which became the standard treatment in 2013, has found that maintenance therapy in low-risk patients following this therapy may be unnecessary, although this is controversial.

=== Relapsed or refractory disease ===
==== 1990s ====
In 1998, Arsenic trioxide (As_{2}O_{3}) had been evaluated for treatment of relapsed/refractory disease. Remission with arsenic trioxide has been reported. Studies have shown arsenic reorganizes nuclear bodies and degrades the mutant PML-RAR fusion protein. Arsenic also increases caspase activity which then induces apoptosis.

==== 2000s ====
Arsenic trioxide (As_{2}O_{3}) can also reduce the relapse rate for high risk patients. In Japan a synthetic retinoid, tamibarotene, is licensed for use as a treatment for ATRA-resistant APL.

=== Investigational agents ===
Some evidence supports the potential therapeutic utility of histone deacetylase inhibitors such as valproic acid or vorinostat in treating APL. According to one study, a cinnamon extract has effect on the apoptotic process in acute myeloid leukemia HL-60 cells.

== Prognosis ==
Prognosis is generally good relative to other leukemias. Because of the acuteness of onset compared to other leukemias, early death is comparatively more common. If untreated, it has a median survival of less than a month. It has been transformed from a highly fatal disease to a highly curable one. The cause of early death is most commonly severe bleeding, often intracranial hemorrhage. Early death from hemorrhage occurs in 5–10% of patients in countries with adequate access to healthcare and 20–30% of patients in less developed countries. Risk factors for early death due to hemorrhage include delayed diagnosis, late treatment initiation, and high white blood cell count on admission. Despite advances in treatment, early death rates have remained relatively constant, as described by several groups including Scott McClellan, Bruno Medeiros, and Ash Alizadeh at Stanford University.

Relapse rates are extremely low. Most deaths following remission are from other causes, such as second malignancies, which in one study occurred in 8% of patients. In this study, second malignancies accounted for 41% of deaths, and heart disease, 29%. Survival rates were 88% at 6.3 years and 82% at 7.9 years.

In another study, the 10-year survival rate was estimated to be approximately 77%.

== Epidemiology ==
Acute promyelocytic leukemia represents 10–12% of AML cases. The median age is approximately 30–40 years, which is considerably younger than the other subtypes of AML (70 years), however in elderly population APL has peculiar characteristics. Incidence is higher among individuals of Latin American or South European origin. It can also occur as a secondary malignancy in those that receive treatment with topoisomerase II inhibitors (such as the anthracyclines and etoposide) due to the carcinogenic effects of these agents, with patients with breast cancer representing the majority of such patients. Around 40% of patients with APL also have a chromosomal abnormality such as trisomy 8 or isochromosome 17 which do not appear to impact on long-term outcomes.

== Research ==
=== Oral-arsenic preparation ===
==== Oral arsenic trioxide ====
In 1998, researchers at the University of Hong Kong revived oral arsenic or the “modern” liquor arsenicalis to treat APL patients. The research group from the University of Hong Kong and Queen Mary Hospital did a series of works to observe the clinical effect of oral arsenic trioxide. They proposed that oral arsenic trioxide had a short-term efficacy and safety profile similar to intravenous arsenic trioxide. They then found that oral arsenic trioxide, particularly in prolonged maintenance with and ATRA, may obviate the need for stem cells transplantation in relapsed pediatric APL individuals. Their recent findings proposed a triple combination regimen with oral arsenic trioxide, ATRA, and ascorbic acid maintenance, which was safe and resulted in favorable long-term survival. As of 2023 they are still testing this strategy prospectively to further rigorously assess its long-term effects. Gill et al. reported the results of a clinical study of newly diagnosed APL from 1991 to 2021. They found that oral arsenic trioxide-based regimens significantly improved all survivals of APL individuals. In view of these findings, arsenic trioxide (intravenous or oral) may be incorporated into all phases of treatment. In addition, the use of entirely nonchemotherapy in elderly patients can also be explored to reduce drug toxicity.

==== Oral arsenic realgar-Indigo naturalis formula ====
As of 2023 another oral arsenic compound, Realgar-Indigo naturalis formula (RIF) with the chemical formula of As4S4, is promising for APL treatment, including the adult, pediatric, and elderly APL patients, by researchers in China.
