= Analogy (disambiguation) =

Analogy is a cognitive process of transferring information or meaning from a particular subject to another.

Analogy may also refer to:

- Analogy (biology), a similarity of trait or organ in two unrelated organisms
- Analogical modeling, a linguistic theory
- Analogy (album), an album released in 1972 by the band Analogy
- Analogy (band), a German and Italian rock band active in the 1970s
- Argument from analogy, a method of reasoning in inductive logic
- Dynamical analogies, an analysis and simulation approach in engineering
  - Hydraulic analogy, representation of electrical circuits as hydraulic circuits
  - Aerodynamic analogies, relations of various Euler angles in transformations of Aircraft flight dynamics
  - Mechanical–electrical analogies, representation of mechanical systems as electrical networks
    - Impedance analogy, focus on same effective impedance
    - Mobility analogy, focus on same topology

== See also ==
- Analog (disambiguation)
