= Peri-implant mucositis =

Peri-implant mucositis is defined as an inflammatory lesion of the peri-implant mucosa in the absence of continuing marginal bone loss.

The American Academy of Periodontology defines peri‐implant mucositis as a disease in which inflammation of the soft tissues surrounding a dental implant is present without additional bone loss after the initial bone remodeling that may occur during healing following the surgical placement of the implant.

Peri-implant mucositis is largely accepted as the precursor of peri-implantitis and corresponds to gingivitis around natural teeth.

Important criteria to defining peri-implant mucositis are, the inflammation of mucosa surrounding an endosseous implant and the absence of continuing marginal peri-implant bone loss.

== Aetiology ==
A shift in bacterial biofilm composition, from uninterrupted plaque maturation, and the immune system disintegration causes peri-implant mucosa inflammation to occur.

In peri-implant mucositis, there is an increase in proportion of bacteria from the orange complex: F. nucleatum, P. intermedia and Eubacterium species. A decrease in proportion of Streptococci and Actinomoyces species is also observed.

Accumulation of bacteria around osseointegrated dental implants has been proven to be a cause of peri-implant mucositis by demonstrating this under experimental conditions and the development of an inflammatory response due to this has also been shown experimentally. When the surfaces of the implant in the mouth are colonised by pathogenic bacteria, plaque-induced inflammation can go on to cause destruction of the tissues around the implant. The presence of an inflammatory cell infiltrate in the connective tissue lateral to the junctional epithelium has been discovered in this condition, contributing to its development. The bacterial biofilm disrupts the host-microbe homeostasis, creating a dysbiosis which results in an inflammatory lesion. The inflammatory cell infiltrate has been found to increase in size as the peri-implant mucositis develops.

Where peri-implant mucositis has been brought about by the accumulation of bacteria and their formation of a biofilm, it has been shown to be eventually reversible once the biofilm has been brought under control by regular cleaning by both patient and dental professional. This has been shown as studies display a clear reduction in redness, swelling and bleeding on probing in lesions of the peri-implant soft tissue after bacterial load has been minimised. This was shown in an experiment where bacteria were encouraged to accumulate for a period of time in which no oral hygiene was undertaken, allowing all of the patients to develop peri-implant mucositis. When oral hygiene was regularly commenced once again, all of the periodontal tissues eventually became healthy once more. However, the best management of peri-implant mucositis is not reversing it but preventing this from occurring in the first instance.

The presence of excess luting cement has been demonstrated to contribute to causing peri-implant mucositis. One study gleaned results that suggested that in both patients with and without a history of periodontal problems, implants with extracoronal residual cement developed statistically significantly more cases of peri-implant mucositis as well as other periodontal problems. In this study 85% of implants in patients with previous periodontal conditions went on to develop peri-implant mucositis, which then progressed to peri-implantitis. In the group with no previous history of periodontal issues, 65% of implants still developed peri-implant mucositis, but significantly fewer of these implants then developed peri-implantitis. In contrast, the group with no extracoronal residual cement only had 30% of implants develop peri-implant mucositis. Therefore, cement remnants may be more likely to cause patients to develop peri-implant mucositis.

Other causal factors of peri-implant mucositis include radiation and smoking, in addition to accretion of oral bacteria at the site. Other factors that are thought to contribute to the condition include lack of keratinised mucosa and diabetes mellitus, particularly poorly-controlled diabetes which will mean the patient will have a high level of blood glucose over longer periods. Understanding and controlling peri-implant mucositis is essential as it often leads to peri-implantitis.

== Signs and symptoms ==
Clinical signs and symptoms of peri-implant mucositis involves the localised surrounding gingival tissues (gum tissue) of a dental implant. These include:-

1. Bleeding on probing with no supporting bone loss.
2. Localised swelling
3. Redness/erythema.
4. Increased shininess of soft tissue surface.
5. Soreness

=== Risk Factors ===
Risk Factors of PIM are categorised into General and Local Risk Factors

General Risk Factors

1. Smoking
2. Radiation Therapy
3. Poorly controlled Diabetes Mellitus (HbA1c >10.1)

Local Risk Factors

1. Oral Hygiene
2. Poor compliance / access to regular supportive implant therapy
3. Design of Implant-supported prostheses affecting accessibility for plaque removal
4. Sub-mucosal restorations
5. Dimension of Keratinized Peri-implant mucosa
6. Excess Cement

Possible Risk Factors:

Some other possible risk factors may include the location the implant is placed, type of implant placed and the age of the subject, as it was found that these factors had significant influences on bleeding on probing (BOP).

Although it is uncertain whether increased abutment roughness will cause an increase in plaque accumulation and hence increase the risk of peri-implant mucositis, a 12-month comparative analysis in humans found that "a further reduction of the surface roughness, below a certain "threshold R(a)" (0.2 microns), has no major impact on the supra‐ and subgingival microbial composition."

Implants and abutments made of zirconium dioxide (ZrO_{2}) were claimed to be more bio-compatible compared to those made of titanium but clinical studies show that there were slightly higher BOP scores or no significant difference in BOP scores around ZrO_{2} compared to titanium abutments.

== Diagnosis ==
In order to diagnose peri-implant mucositis, it is essential to investigate probing parameters and complete a radiographic assessment. Correct diagnosis of peri-implant diseases is essential to allow appropriate management of the condition present. Failure to identify a peri-implant disease can lead to a complete loss of osseointegration and eventual loss of the implant.

Though there are clear structural differences between dental implants and natural teeth, peri-implant health shares many common features with periodontal health around natural teeth. This is especially true with respect to their surrounding tissues and biological attachment.

The diagnosis of peri-implant mucositis should be based on clinical signs of inflammatory disease, and radiographic assessment should be carried out to exclude bone level changes as this is an indication that peri-implant disease has already progressed to peri-implantitis stage.

Clinical presentations to diagnose peri-implant mucositis include:-

- Red, swollen and soft peri-implant tissues

- Bleeding on probing (BoP) and/or suppuration on probing

- Increased probing depths compared to baseline measurements

- Absence of bone loss beyond crestal bone level changes as a result of initial remodelling following implant placement

It has been suggested that the soft tissue cuff surrounding implants are less resistant to probing than the gingiva at adjacent teeth sites. This potentially leads to mechanically induced BoP on dental implants that are clinically healthy, as a result of trauma-induced BoP rather than a sign of biofilm-induced inflammation which represent the presence of peri-implant disease. Increased levels of bleeding on probing was present at 67% of sites where there is peri-implant mucositis as it is indicative of the presence of active disease and inflammation of the peri-implant mucosa. A light probing force of 0.25N should be used to probe the gingival margins so as not to damage the soft periodontal tissues. Bleeding on probing can be used in order to predict future loss of support from surrounding tissues. Microbiological testing was shown to improve the prognostic features compared to recording bleeding on probing alone as this was better for recognising the disease advancement around implants.

Increased probing depths over time is linked to loss of attachment and a reduction in the supporting alveolar bone levels. When bone becomes involved, the disease has progressed to peri-implantitis and this site is no longer diagnosed with peri-implant mucositis. The presence of bleeding on probing, the probing depths measured to the base of any pocketing and suppuration should all be assessed regularly in order to correctly diagnose peri-implant mucositis. Mucosal recession, a draining sinus or fistula and swelling or hyperplasia of the gingivae surrounding the implant can all signify the presence of peri-implant disease and should all prompt further investigations to ascertain whether this is the case.

Radiographs are required to distinguish between peri-implant mucositis and peri-implantitis as the supporting alveolar bone levels must be evaluated in order to decide on a diagnosis. Dental Panoramic Tomography or a variety of intra-oral radiographs can be used to monitor marginal bone levels and evaluate interproximal bone loss in particular, but most agree peri-apical radiographs show bone loss more comprehensively. Current radiographs can be compared to previous radiographs and the distance from a fixed point, such as the implant shoulder, used to measure the bone loss in mm over time. If an implant is mobile, this is indicative of a deficiency in osseointegration and at this point the implant should be removed. Therefore, this is not a valuable factor for early diagnosis of peri-implant mucositis.

Alveolar bone loss following implant placement after first year in function should not exceed 2mm as generally between 0.5 – 2 mm of crestal bone height is lost during remodelling/healing process. As such changes ≥ 2mm during or after the first year should be considered as pathologic. Ie Peri-implant disease-induced.

There are currently no biochemical diagnostic tests clinically available, as no sensitive diagnostic test has yet been found that can detect reversible changes before this is clinically visible and detectable. There are many salivary biomarkers and biomarkers in the crevicular fluid surrounding implants that are present in much higher levels when there is peri-implant mucositis or peri-implant disease but all these present after or at the same time as clinical signs and symptoms. Therefore, there is currently no benefit to assessing the peri-implant fluid or analysing the saliva. Research continues in this field, though there is also no biochemical diagnostic test clinically available to detect the progression of gingivitis or periodontitis as of yet.

== Prevention and Maintenance ==
The best management of peri-implant mucositis is preventing it from occurring through maintenance of the implants. This involves regular cleaning from both the patient and a dental professional and antibacterial mouthwashes may help reduce plaque and bleeding around dental implants.

=== Self-care ===
Various mechanical ways of removing bacteria from around implants are available to be used by patients in their own homes, including but not limited to nylon-coated interdental brushes, soft-bristled toothbrushes and hard plastic cleaning instruments. These are all designed to prevent damage of the implant abutment, which would roughen the surface and lead to the accumulation of more bacteria on the surface which would contribute to the formation of more biofilms in the area.

However, it was found that there were no statistically significant differences between some types of self administered antimicrobials, as they were all equally successful at maintaining the health of the soft tissues. One study was done comparing hyaluronic acid gel and chlorhexidine gel and another compared amine fluoride/stannous fluoride mouthwash to chlorhexidine mouthwash, but neither study showed either antimicrobial to be more effective at preventing peri-implant mucositis.

It was found that there was no statistically significant difference between the effectiveness of using a powered/sonic toothbrush and using a manual toothbrush, although participants reported that they preferred the sonic toothbrush as they felt that it was better at keeping the areas around the implants clean.

=== Dental Professional ===
In terms of professionally administered treatment done by a dentist, there was no evidence to suggest that phosphoric acid etching gel is any more clinically advantageous than scaling or mechanical debridement and polishing or that enclosing chlorhexidine in the inner part of an implant is in any way superior to a physiological solution.

It was also shown that a topical antibiotic inserted submucosally is no more successful at preventing peri-implant mucositis than a chlorhexidine gel.

Debridement with manual curettes, followed by air polishing with glycine powder, and a prophylaxis brush, showed significant differences in BOP and peri-implant pocket depths. The use of manual curettes, sonic-driven scaler, and prophylaxis brush were found to be effective in maintaining the tissues around an implant, preventing inflammation. Applying chlorhexidine varnish in addition to debridement on implant surfaces had no significant additional benefit.

== Treatment ==
When prevention of peri-implant mucositis fails, there are several options available to treat it.

A similar study was conducted to assess if there was a difference between using sonic/powered toothbrushes and using manual toothbrushes in the treatment of peri-implant mucositis and it was found that there is no statistically significant difference between the two in terms of intervention either.

Irrigants were also tested as part of a set of interventions administered by dental professionals but it was found that there was no statistically significant difference between chlorhexidine and physiologic solutions when used as irrigants at second state surgery to maintain health of soft tissues.

Reduced mean plaque scores and reduced marginal bleeding scores were achieved more effectively from chlorhexidine irrigation than from the use of chlorhexidine mouthwash. Listerine mouthwash was found to be statistically significantly better than a placebo at attaining reduced mean plaque scores and reduced marginal bleeding scores. When Listerine mouthwash was used twice daily for 30 seconds in addition to routine oral hygiene, it was shown that a reduction of 54% in mean plaque and 34% in marginal bleeding compared to a placebo. Chlorhexidine irrigations reduced mean plaque by 20% and marginal bleeding by 35% in comparison to a chlorhexidine mouthwash. Chlorhexidine is the most effective antiplaque agent used in the mouth to date. Reducing the mean plaque scores and the marginal bleeding scores contributes to both the prevention and the treatment of peri-implant mucositis. Initially, the use of mouthwashes was only proposed for patients with physical disabilities which would result in decreased manual dexterity and hence make active cleaning difficult. However, it is now thought that this will lead to less peri-implant mucositis being caused in all implant patients. Despite this, there have been concerns about the link between mouthwashes containing alcohol and the incidence of oral cancer.

Some studies looked solely at interventions which contribute to the reversal of peri-implant mucositis. One such study found no statistically significant difference between triclosan dentrifice in comparison to sodium fluoride dentrifice at recovering soft tissue health. There were also two trials conducted where patients with peri-implant mucositis were assessed after different interventions carried out by dental professionals. In these trials mechanical debridement being followed by minocycline or chlorhexidine gel had no statistically significant difference, nor did debridement with titanium curettes compared to an ultrasonic debridement tool.

=== Nouveau interventions ===
A double‐blind randomized controlled trial assessing the effect of subgingival ozone (O_{3}, gaseous ozone) and/or hydrogen peroxide on the development of peri‐implant mucositis, found that ozone showed significant potential for management of peri-implant mucositis compared to oxygen and saline.

Mechanical curettage with adjunct antimicrobial photodynamic therapy is more effective in reducing peri-implant inflammation in smokeless tobacco product users as compared to mechanical curettage alone in the short term (3 months). Further long-term studies will be needed to confirm long term efficacy.

Current research found no evidence for use of systemic antibiotics in the treatment of peri-implant mucositis

== Further Discussion ==
- There is low quality evidence to suggest the most effective treatments for peri-implant mucositis, with no reliable evidence for which are more beneficial in the long term. All trials so far have had generally short follow-up periods and limited numbers of subjects. It is expected we will learn more about peri-implant mucositis as the number of patients opting to have implants continues to rise.
- There is little evidence for the most effective interventions for maintaining health and reversing the effects of peri-implant mucositis on the soft periodontal tissues.
- More RCTs should be conducted on implants and their potential failure and the inflammation of the periodontal tissues that can be caused by them, especially long term studies. Such trials will likely be difficult and expensive to carry out but there is definitely a need for them in order to find a definitive answer on how implants should be maintained and treated.
- Research is being continued into the investigations of peri-implant crevicular fluid and saliva in an attempt to find biomarkers that are diagnostic and will be indicative of peri-implant mucositis before the disease has started and other clinical signs and symptoms are visible.
- There are concerns with metal and ultrasonic instrumentation roughening implant surface and causing increased plaque retention. Studies in vitro have found that special coated scalers and ultrasonic tips (e.g. newly developed metallic tip and plastic hand curettes) were compatible with implant surfaces and caused minimal damage. However, this is yet to be confirmed in vivo. It was also found that plastic-coated scalers left plastic deposits on implant surfaces, hence more research is needed for evaluating their use in debriding implant.
- Studies on patient perception on comfort regarding hand scaling compared to ultrasonic scaling will be helpful in order to increase patient compliance, especially in the event that hand and ultrasonic instrumentation were found to be equally effective.
