= Coumachlor =

Names
- IUPAC name 3-[1-(4-chlorophenyl)-3-oxobutyl]-2-hydroxychromen-4-one

Identifiers
| CAS Number | 81-82-3 |
| 3D model (JSmol) | Interactive image |
| ChemSpider | 10443016 |
| ECHA InfoCard | 100.001.254 |
| PubChem CID | 6692 |
| UNII | UCD8XZW42P |
| CompTox Dashboard (EPA) | DTXSID8041797 |
- InChI: InChI=1S/C19H15ClO4/c1-11(21)10-15(12-6-8-13(20)9-7-12)17-18(22)14-4-2-3-5-16(14)24-19(17)23/h2-9,15,22H,10H2,1H3 Key: DEKWZWCFHUABHE-UHFFFAOYSA-N; InChI=1/C19H15ClO4/c1-11(21)10-15(12-6-8-13(20)9-7-12)17-18(22)14-4-2-3-5-16(14)24-19(17)23/h2-9,15,22H,10H2,1H3 Key: DEKWZWCFHUABHE-UHFFFAOYAJ
- SMILES: CC(=O)CC(C1=CC=C(C=C1)Cl)C2=C(C3=CC=CC=C3OC2=O)O

Properties
| Chemical formula | C_{19}H_{15}ClO_{4} |
| Molar mass | 342.77 g/mol |
- Except where otherwise noted, data are given for materials in their standard state (at 25 °C [77 °F], 100 kPa). Infobox references

Coumachlor is a first generation anticoagulant rodenticide which blocks formation of prothrombin and inhibits blood coagulation causing death by internal haemorrhage. The chemical can be absorbed through the skin. The symptoms of human contact can be nosebleeds, bleeding gums, bloody urine, extensive bruising in the absence of injury, fatigue, shortness of breath (dyspnea) on exertion. The human consumption or inhalation of compound can also cause fluid in lungs (pulmonary edema).
