= Recombinant =

Recombinant may refer to:

- Recombinant organism – an organism that contains a different combination of alleles from either of its parents.
- Recombinant DNA – a form of artificial DNA sequence
- Recombinant protein - artificially produced (and often purified) protein
- Recombinant virus – a virus formed by recombining genetic material
- VRLA – a valve regulated lead acid (VRLA) battery that is also referred to as a recombinant battery
- InSoc Recombinant – an album by synthpop band Information Society

== See also ==
- Recombination (disambiguation)
