= Tamibarotene =

Names
- Preferred IUPAC name 4-[(5,5,8,8-Tetramethyl-5,6,7,8-tetrahydronaphthalen-2-yl)carbamoyl]benzoic acid

Identifiers
CAS Number	94497-51-5
3D model (JSmol)	Interactive image
Beilstein Reference	3564473
ChEBI	CHEBI:32181
ChEMBL	ChEMBL25202
ChemSpider	97231
DrugBank	DB04942
IUPHAR/BPS	2648
KEGG	D01418
PubChem CID	108143
UNII	08V52GZ3H9
CompTox Dashboard (EPA)	DTXSID5046853
- InChI: InChI=1S/C22H25NO3/c1-21(2)11-12-22(3,4)18-13-16(9-10-17(18)21)23-19(24)14-5-7-15(8-6-14)20(25)26/h5-10,13H,11-12H2,1-4H3,(H,23,24)(H,25,26)
- SMILES: O=C(O)c1ccc(cc1)C(=O)Nc2ccc3c(c2)C(CCC3(C)C)(C)C

Properties
Chemical formula	C_{22}H_{25}NO_{3}
Molar mass	351.446 g·mol^{−1}
- Except where otherwise noted, data are given for materials in their standard state (at 25 °C [77 °F], 100 kPa). Infobox references

Tamibarotene (brand name: Amnolake), also called retinobenzoic acid, is orally active, synthetic retinoid, developed to overcome all-trans retinoic acid (ATRA) resistance, with potential antineoplastic activity against acute promyelocytic leukaemia (APL) . It is currently marketed only in Japan and early trials have demonstrated that it tends to be better tolerated than ATRA. Tamibarotene has been tested in many other cancer types, including Acute Myeloid Leukemia where it shows no benefit, and lung cancer, where it accelerated the cancer growth and increased mortality.

It has also been investigated as a possible treatment for Alzheimer's disease, multiple myeloma and Crohn's disease. Tamibarotene shows a similar side effect profile to Tretinoin, but exhibits lower clearance, resulting in improved dosing regiments. Hyperlipidemia is a common finding from Tamibarotene dosing.

== Synthesis ==
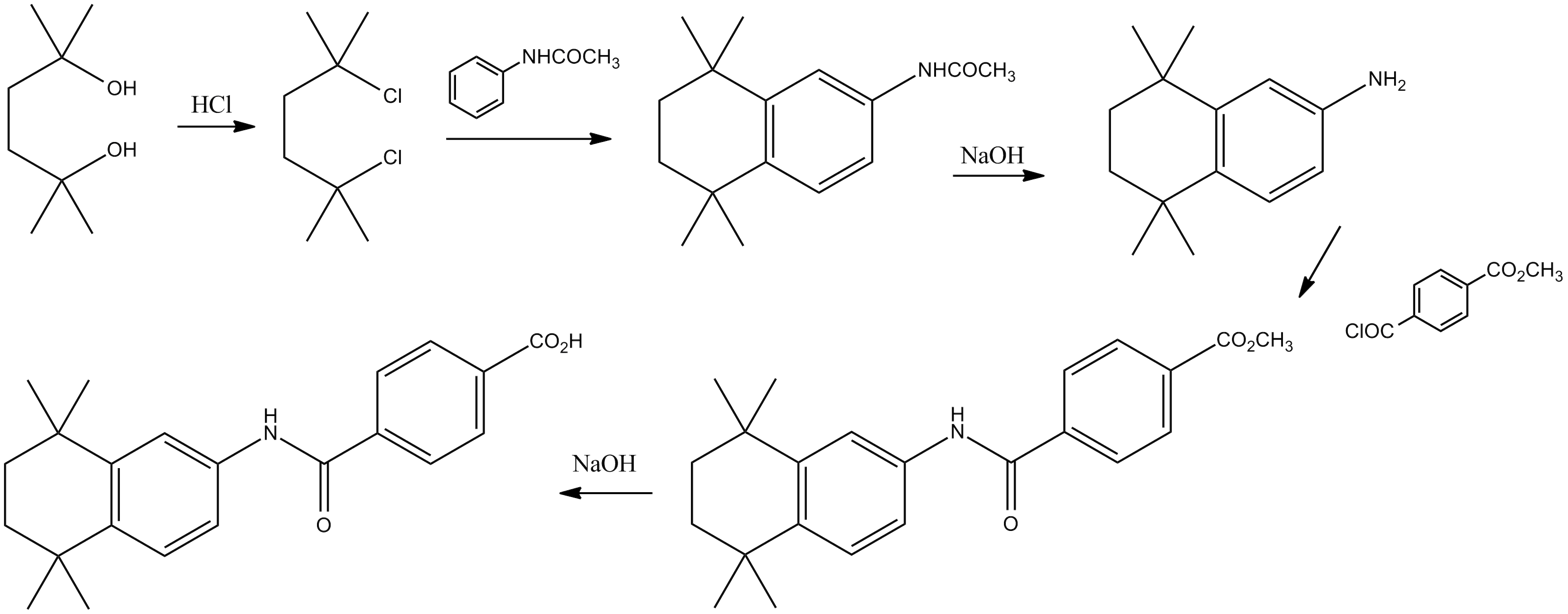

Reaction of the diol (1) with hydrogen chloride affords the corresponding dichloro derivative (2). Aluminum chloride mediated Friedel–Crafts alkylation of acetanilide with the dichloride affords the tetralin (3). Basic hydrolysis leads to the primary amine (4). Acylation of the primary amino group with the half acid chloride half ester from terephthalic acid (5) leads to the amide (6). Basic hydrolysis of the ester grouping then affords (7).
