= Root analogue dental implant =

Custom medical device

A root-analogue dental implant (RAI) – also known as a truly anatomic dental implant, or an anatomical/custom implant – is a medical device to replace one or more roots of a single tooth immediately after extraction. In contrast to common titanium screw type implants, these implants are custom-made to exactly match the extraction socket of the specific patient. Thus there is usually no need for surgery.

As the root analogue dental implant matches the dental alveolus (tooth socket) it can only be placed immediately after the tooth extraction. If the tooth has been already lost and the soft and hard tissue is already healed, an RAI can no longer be placed.

The basic principle of endosseous implants is a biological process described as osseointegration, in which materials such as titanium or ceramic form an intimate bond to bone. There are no particular differences between the osseointegration of a root analogue implant and a conventional screw type implant.

== Disadvantages of conventional implants ==
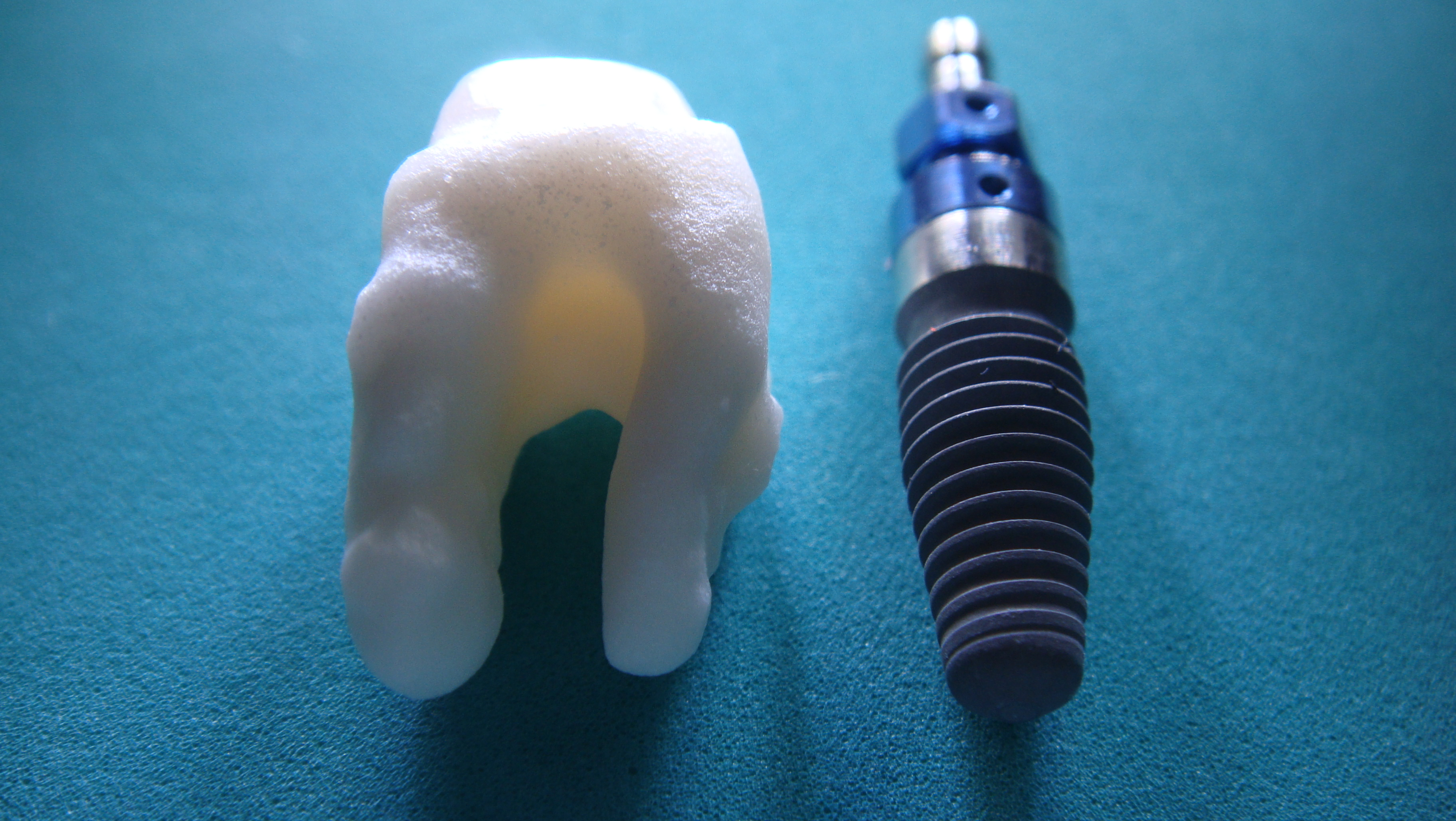
Root analogue ceramic dental implant in comparison with titanium screw type implant

As technology has improved, so has implant success rate. Conventional titanium dental implants typically have success rates of 90–95% for 10-year follow-up periods, but this is based on questionable definitions of success. The fundamental problem with conventional implant technology is that the patient must be altered to fit the screw or cylinder implant, rather than the other way around.

A tooth has one or more roots. Even a single-rooted tooth is nearly twice as wide in one direction as in the other. A cylindrical screw-type implant does not resemble a tooth, so invasive surgery is needed to make it fit into an existing tooth socket. Such surgery involves drilling into healthy bone, filling gaps between implant and bone either with bone or bone substitutes, and frequently sinus lift procedures.

Titanium screws are prone to peri-implantitis and plaque accumulation, leading to further interventions. The grey colour of titanium tends to show through gums, and in case of gum and bone recession, esthetic outcome is often highly unpredictable. Moreover, there are concerns over possible long-term corrosion and release of ions to the body environment, so researchers are evaluating non-metallic alternatives.

== Root analogue implants ==
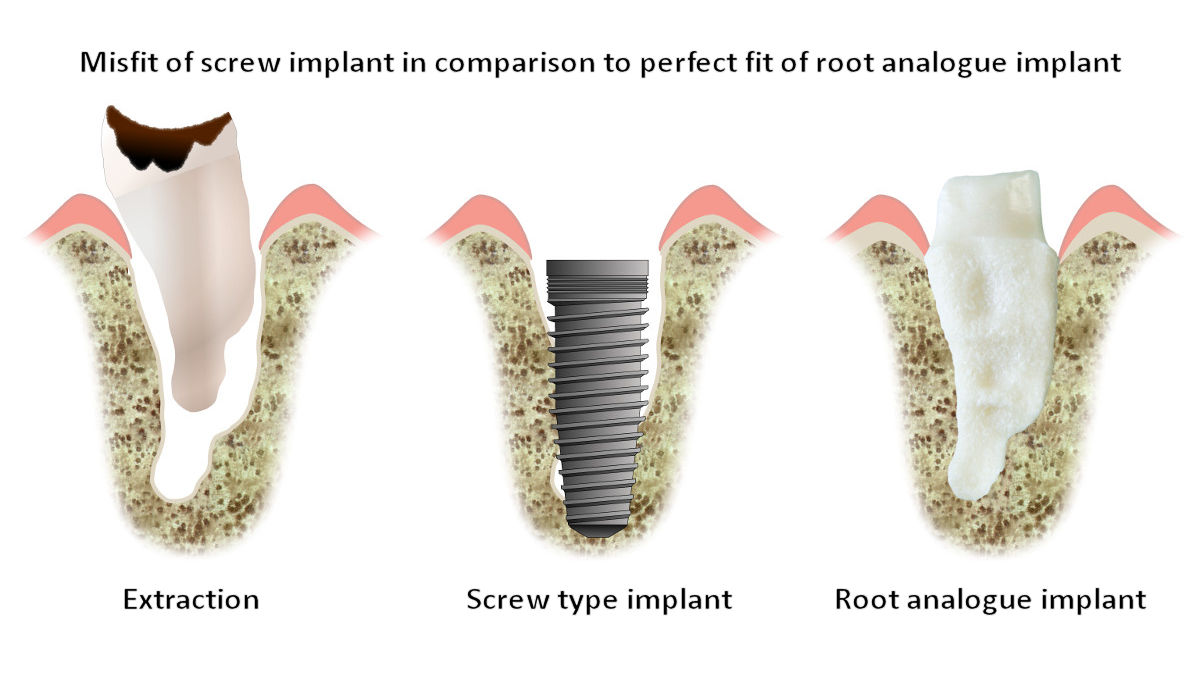
Illustration showing comparison of screw type implant with root analogue implant

X-rays of root analogue dental implants in different regions

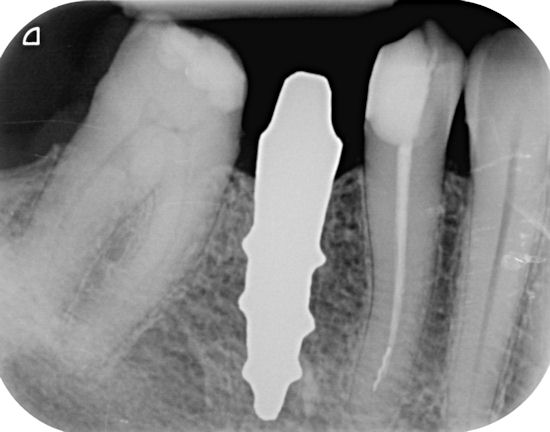
X-ray of root analogue dental implant single rooted right lower second premolar

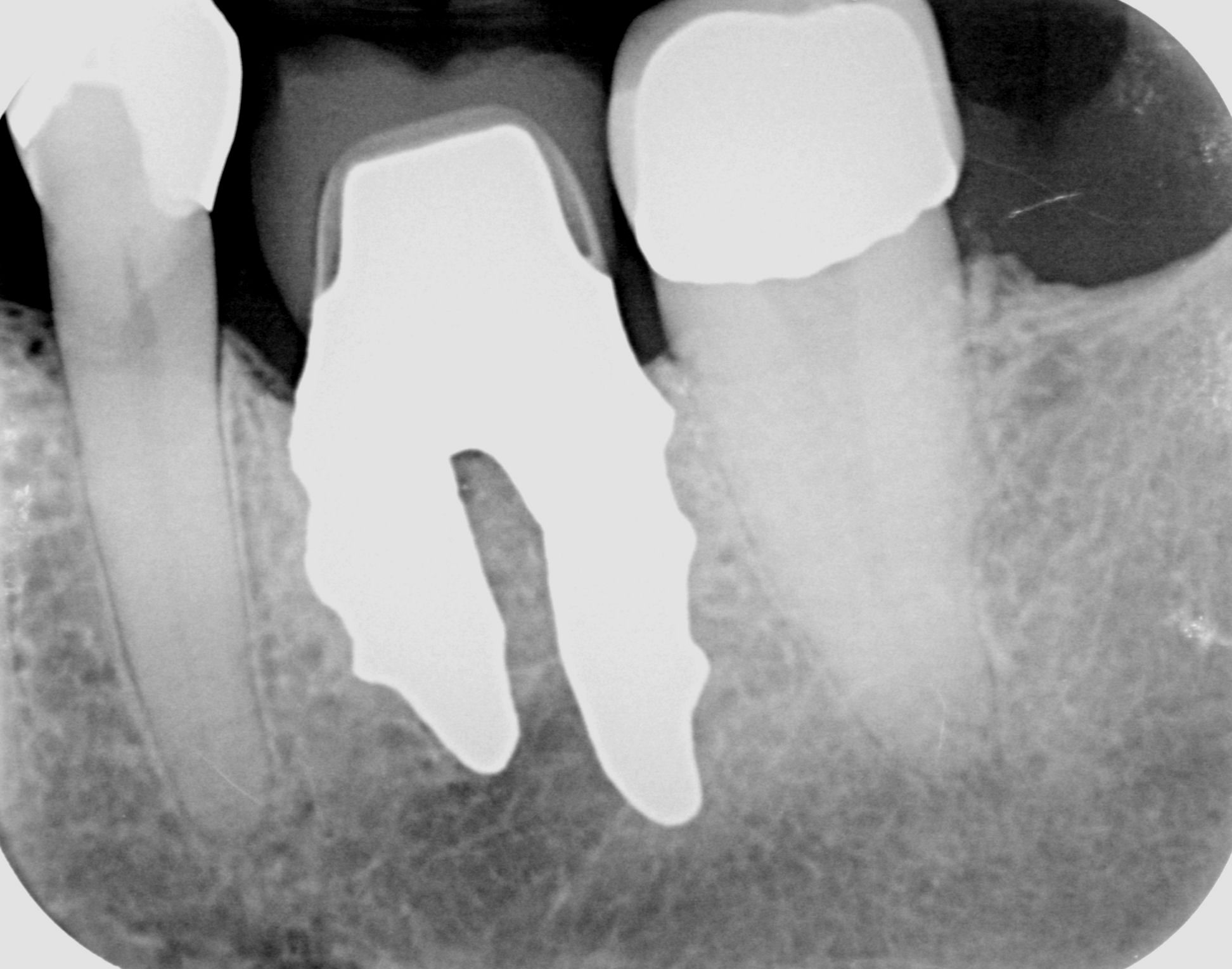
X-ray of root analogue dental implant two rooted left lower molar

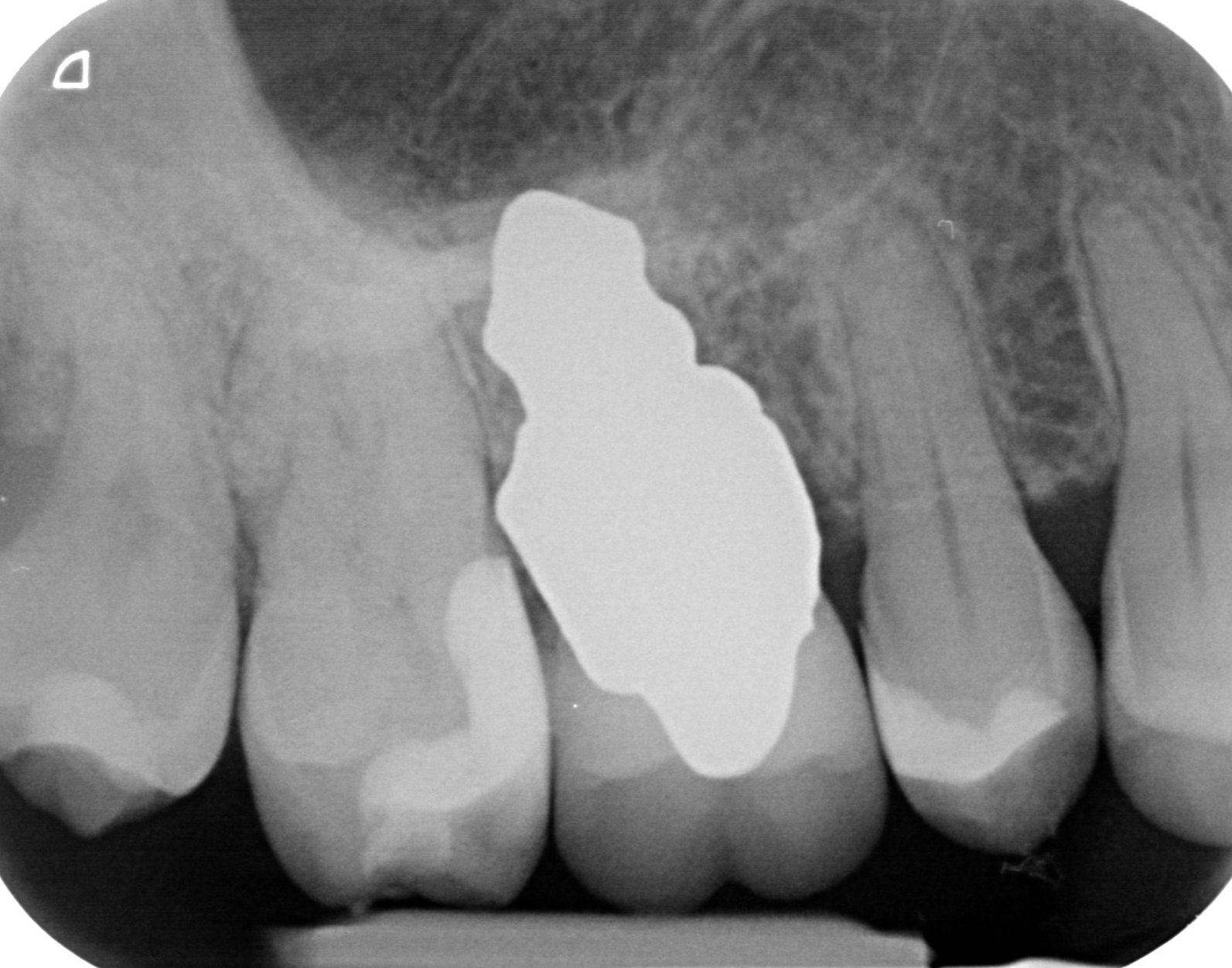
X-ray of root analogue three rooted dental implant right first upper molar

RAIs are custom made to perfectly fit the tooth socket of a specific patient immediately after tooth extraction. Therefore every implant is unique. As an optimised root-form it is much more than a simple 1:1 replica of a tooth. Since it exactly fills the gap left after the tooth is extracted, surgery is rarely needed. The implant can be produced from a copy of the extracted tooth, an impression of the tooth socket, or from a CT scan or CBCT scan. The advantage of a CBCT scan is that the implant can be produced before extraction. With the former methods, it takes one or two days to fabricate an implant.

A root analogue implant can be fabricated from zirconium dioxide (zirconia) or titanium. Successful titanium RAIs have been three-dimensionally printed as porous one-piece implants, using CAD software. However, zirconia is the preferred material, because it is more esthetic in colour, with no grey discolouration visible through gums.

Zirconium dioxide is doped with small amounts of yttria, which results in a material with superior thermal, mechanical, and electrical properties, and enhanced fracture toughness – ideal for surgical implants. Zirconia is metal free and is biocompatible, and has low bacterial affinity in comparison to regular titanium.

An alternative technique uses a titanium root fused to a zirconia abutment by a sintering process that eliminates any possible microgap (which could cause peri-implantitis, leading to bone loss around the implant).

True 'root-form analogue' or 'anatomic' dental implants have been attempted in the past. Those early attempts failed because of insufficient knowledge of healing of cortical and spongy bone, method, material, tooling, and technology. The principle of differentiated osseointegration, in conjunction with suitable material and technology, has enabled the first success in this field

== The principle of "differentiated osseointegration" ==
Differentiated osseointegration describes the guided equilibrium of bone-to-implant distance, contact and compression, taking into account spongy or cortical bone, in order to achieve secure osseointegration of individual anatomical dental implants.

The design of the implant surface is crucial in integrating all three possible primary bone-to-implant contact scenarios:

- Contact in the area of the exact root replica, for an immediate start of primary osseointegration without bone trauma;
- Distance at the thin buccal and lingual cortical plates, to safely avoid fracture and pressure resorption of this sensitive bone;
- Compression with macro retentions only in areas of spongy bone to maintain safe primary stability during the entire osseointegration phase.

The combination of all these factors is the most important condition for osseointegration of anatomically shaped dental implants.

== Technique ==
Video showing placement of root analogue ceramic dental implant without surgery, and outcome at one year follow-up

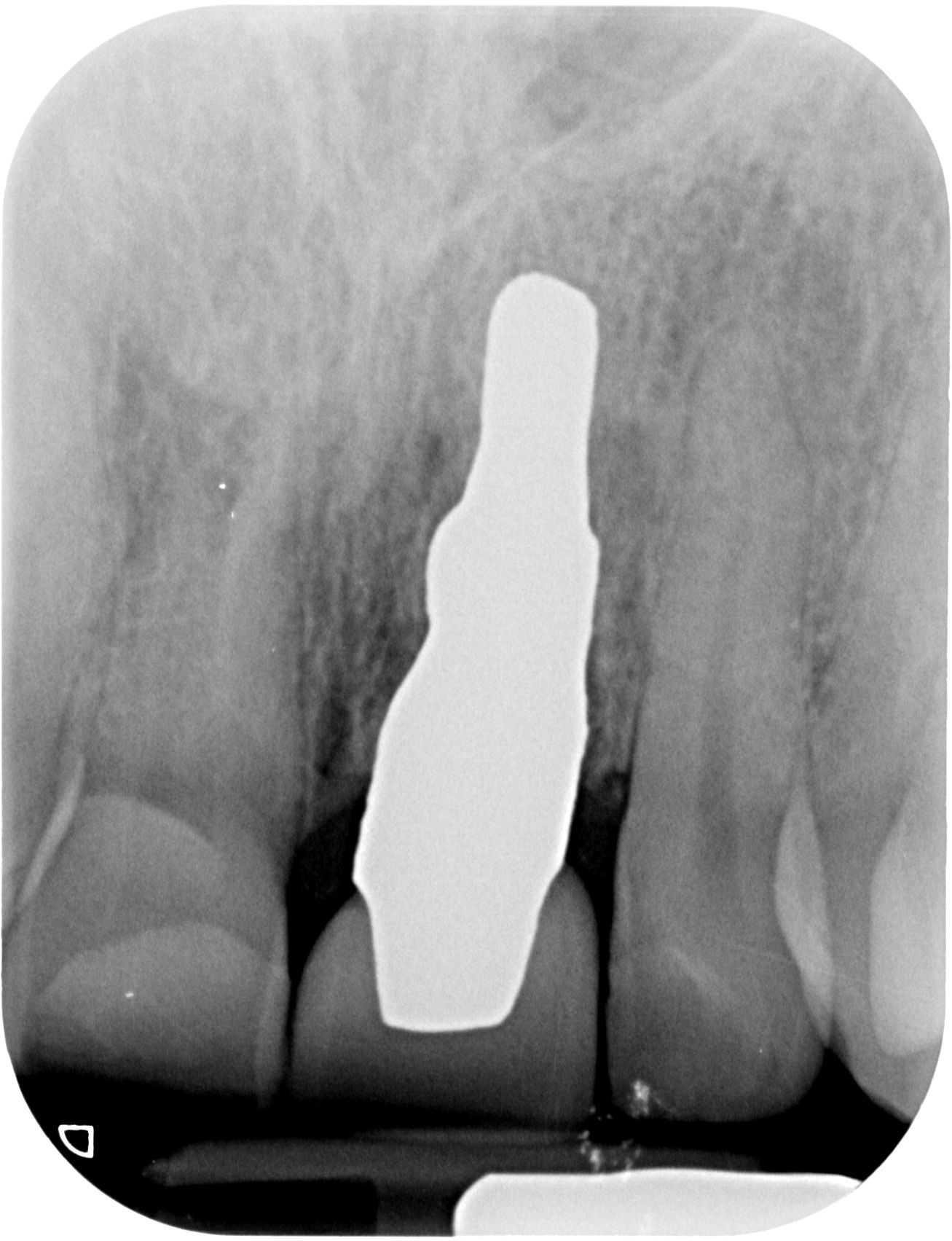
X-ray of root analogue dental implant corresponding to above surgical video

Treatment consists of three steps:

- Obtain the 3D form of the tooth to be replaced. This is done either through careful tooth extraction and scanning of the root, taking an impression of the tooth socket, or a pre-op CBCT scan. The root analogue implant is produced using modern CAD/CAM technology, based on the principle of differentiated osseointegration;
- Atraumatic extraction of the hopeless tooth;
- Placement of the root analogue implant by tapping it in. In general, no surgery is necessary. In particular, no sinus lift or invasive surgery is ever necessary. The implant is placed immediately if it has been produced beforehand from a CBCT scan, or the next day if root has to be scanned or an impression of the socket is used. A protective splint is fitted to protect the implant during the healing period.

Recovery time is very fast as neither soft nor hard tissue is traumatised. Typically, even the day after implant placement there is no swelling, bruising or pain. After 8–12 weeks' healing period, the final crown may be fitted by a family dentist.

== Advantages ==
- Can be placed by any family dentist, requiring no specific surgical skills; there are no guidelines besides indications and contra-indications. The implant is placed with simple tools, typically in less than a minute.
- Natural form: a custom milled anatomic implant replicates the natural form of a tooth, so it simply fits into the tooth socket. Like the original tooth, a root analogue implant can have single- and multi-rooted forms.
- Esthetic: a ceramic RAI closely resembles a natural tooth in colour. Thus there is no discolouration through the gums, as is commonly seen with titanium implants.
- No drilling or surgery, or bone augmentation, is necessary. The patient never needs a sinus lift. There is no additional bone loss, in contrast to a conventional implant where bone must be drilled. No antibiotics are necessary.
- Extremely low risk of peri-implantitis: a conventional implant has a screw winding which is prone to peri-implantitis if it is exposed to the mouth environment. A RAI has none of these problems. Similarly, as it is a single piece implant, there are no gaps which can be infected.
- Immediate: a RAI is placed into a tooth socket immediately or the next day after tooth removal. Injury to neighbouring roots, nerves or sinus is impossible.
- Widely applicable: RAIs can be used in approximately 30% of cases, as opposed to 5% for conventional implants. The technology is completely open to all common methods of crown reconstruction.
- The consequences in case of implant failure are minimal: the patient's anatomy has not been altered (the tooth socket is unchanged), so there is still the option to switch to a conventional treatment.

== Risks and complications ==
Form alterations to the RAI, in conjunction with the pathology of patient, can only be carried out by a practitioner with the requisite knowledge, experience and skills. A failure rate of 10% appears high because of the wider indications for this implant solution; almost all failures occur within the first 4 weeks. After this period, it is rare to have an implant fail.

== History ==
The earliest known dental implant, discovered in Honduras and dating to 600 AD, is that of a Mayan woman who had several implanted incisors carved from sea shells. At least one of these implants had osseointegrated.

An early example of a dental implant in Western Europe was the discovery of an iron pin in place of an upper incisor, in an Iron Age burial site in Le Chêne, France. The body was that of a wealthy young woman; the iron pin may have been inserted while she was alive. However, the nature of the material (iron) and the lack of sterile conditions suggest that the implant would probably not have osseointegrated.

In modern times, a tooth replica implant in baboons was reported as early as 1969 by Hodosh and colleagues, but the polymethacrylate tooth analogue was encapsulated by soft tissue rather than osseointegrated.

In 1992 Lundgren and colleagues used root analogue titanium implants in an experimental model of immediate implant placement in dogs, with bony integration in 88% of cases. A good fit between implant and bone was considered an important factor for implant success.

For this reason, Kohal et al. in 1997 further refined the approach of root-analogue titanium implants in monkeys by using slightly larger implants to compensate for the lost periodontal ligament. This provided a better fit between implant and extraction socket. In several instances implant insertion led to fractures of the thin buccal wall of the alveolar bone.

An ensuing clinical study in humans in 2002 with root-identical titanium implants showed excellent primary stability, but, disappointingly, nearly half the implants failed after 9 months. This particular implant system was not recommended for clinical use, and clinical trials were stopped.

A new attempt was made by Pirker et al 2004 in a human trial with root analogue zirconia implants, but this time by applying differentiated osseoingration on the surface. In 2011 he reported 90% success rate with this method in a 2.5 year human trial.

Mangano et al in Italy in 2012 reported the successful clinical use of a custom-made root analogue implant made by direct laser metal forming (DLMF) from a CBCT scan. This demonstrated that it is possible to combine CBCT 3D data and CAD/CAM technology to manufacture root-analogue implants with sufficient precision.

In 2012 Moin et al in The Netherlands investigated the accuracy of CBCT and CAD/CAM technology on individual root analogue implants, and concluded that this technique could potentially provide accurate dental implants for immediate placement.

Pour et al in Germany reported a single tooth replacement with a root-analogue hybrid implant in 2017, using a titanium implant fused with a ceramic cover in the esthetic zone.

== Current research and commercial success ==
Successful RAIs are a relatively young technology. In contrast to conventional geometric implants, only a handful of scientific groups have carried out any work in this area since 1964. Reliable data on the long-term use of RAIs in humans are still scarce. There are ongoing efforts to combine CBCT scans with CAD/CAM technology, which would lead to further breakthroughs in this field.

Various techniques are being devised to test the mechanical properties of RAIs, to assess their mechanical and biological safety. Several existing evaluation methods for conventional thread-type implants do not apply to RAIs because of their structural differences.

There is increasing concern in implantology about esthetics, biocompatibility, and the corrosive behaviour of materials. While custom root analogue zirconia implants offer significant benefits over conventional titanium implants, and follow-up studies with patients show high success rates and satisfactory esthetic results, further studies are needed to evaluate surface-bone interactions and mechanical behaviour of zirconia.

A number of root analogue dental implant systems have become commercially available, with varying degrees of success. However, so far, no root analogue dental implant system has received regulatory approval. Despite satisfactory clinical results, none of these solutions is widely available on the market.

A commercially available root-analog dental implant was withdrawn from the market in 2019.

Nevertheless, modern CAD/CAM solutions appear to be the future for custom dental implants.
