= NABP1 =

Identifiers
- Aliases: NABP1, OBFC2A, SOSS-B2, SSB2, nucleic acid binding protein 1
- External IDs: OMIM: 612103; MGI: 1923258; GeneCards: NABP1

Gene location (Human)
Chr.	Chromosome 2 (human)
Band	2q32.3	Start	191,678,068 bp
Band	2q32.3	End	191,741,097 bp

Gene location (Mouse)
Chr.	Chromosome 1 (mouse)
Band	1|1 C1.1	Start	51,505,021 bp
Band	1|1 C1.1	End	51,517,584 bp
RNA expression pattern
Bgee	Human / Mouse (ortholog); Top expressed in: secondary oocyte; amniotic fluid; parietal pleura; spleen; stromal cell of endometrium; epithelium of nasopharynx; decidua; sperm; blood; visceral pleura / Top expressed in: transitional epithelium of urinary bladder; thymus; seminiferous tubule; spermatid; right kidney; granulocyte; brown adipose tissue; yolk sac; intercostal muscle; white adipose tissue; More reference expression data
BioGPS	n/a
Gene ontology
Molecular function	single-stranded DNA binding; DNA binding; protein binding; RNA binding
Cellular component	nucleus; nucleoplasm; cytosol; SOSS complex
Biological process	response to ionizing radiation; double-strand break repair via homologous recombination; DNA repair; cellular response to DNA damage stimulus; snRNA transcription by RNA polymerase II; mitotic cell cycle checkpoint signaling
Sources:Amigo / QuickGO
Orthologs
Databases	NCBI: entry; OMA: entry
Species	Human	Mouse
Entrez	64859	109019
Ensembl	ENSG00000173559	ENSMUSG00000026107
UniProt	Q96AH0	Q8BGW5
RefSeq (mRNA)	NM_001031716; NM_001254736; NM_022837	NM_028696; NM_001310548; NM_001310549
RefSeq (protein)	NP_001026886; NP_001241665	NP_001297477; NP_001297478; NP_082972
Location (UCSC)	Chr 2: 191.68 – 191.74 Mb	Chr 1: 51.51 – 51.52 Mb
PubMed search
- Wikidata
View/Edit Human	View/Edit Mouse

Nucleic acid binding protein 1 is a specific protein that in humans is encoded by the NABP1 gene. NABP1 (nucleic acid binding protein 1) which in another name is also called hSSB2 is a protein that is found in humans that plays an important role in maintaining the genome stability. It also belongs to a group of proteins that can bind to single stranded DNA strand and is also commonly formed during DNA replication and the repair processes. NABP1 is also especially important in the cellular response to DNA damage where it actually helps recruit and organizes other repair proteins at certain sites of damage. NABP1 can also contributes to process such as homologous recombination and the protection of the actual genome from instability created from the surrounding enzymes. Because of its important role in the DNA repair the NABP1 has also been studied for its important involvement in cancer and the other diseases related to the genomic instability.

== Gene and protein information ==
The NABP1 gene specifically encodes nucleic acid binding protein 1, which is single-stranded DNA-binding protein that is also found in human cells. This protein is also commonly referred to as the hSSB2 or OBFC2A. NABP1 belongs to a family of the proteins involved in important cellular processes like DNA replication, recombination and DNA repair. These proteins also can help stabilize these exposed DNA strands and prevent the damage during normal cellular activity.

== Structure ==
The actual NABP1 protein contains a conserved oligonucleotide/oligosaccharide binding (OB) fold domain which is really the part of the protein that lets it bind to the single stranded DNA. This structure also can allow the protein to directly interact with exposed DNA during the processes like DNA replication and also DNA repair. The OB fold is also found in many other single stranded DNA binding proteins which then shows how important it is for helping keep the genome stable and working. [9]

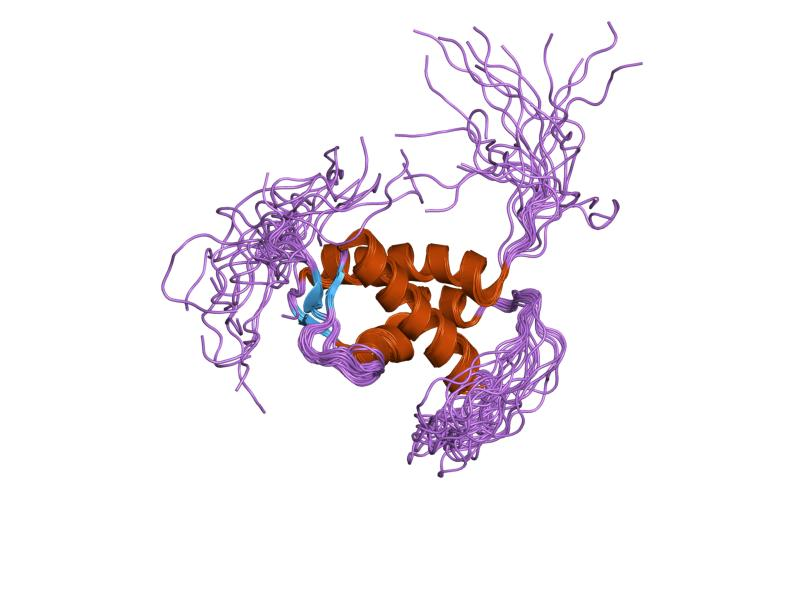
Representation of a protein structure containing an OB-fold domain, which enables binding to single-stranded DNA.

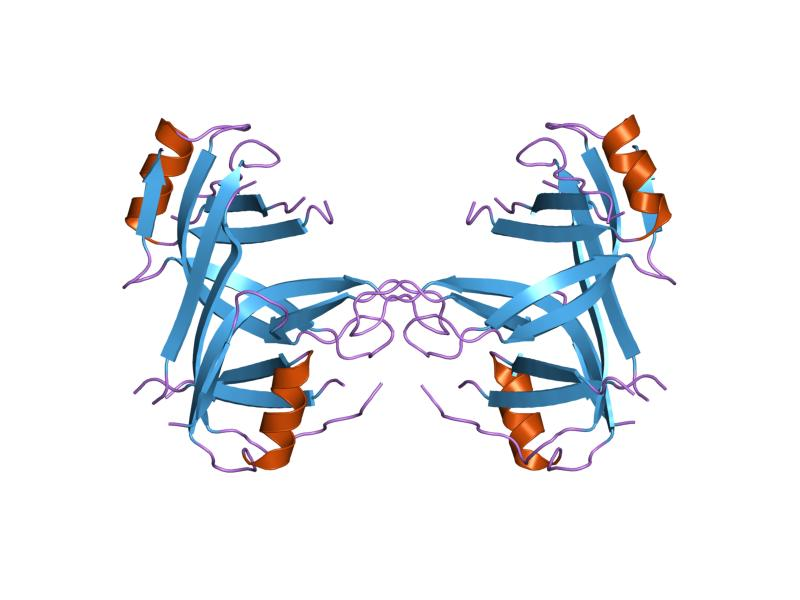
Single-stranded DNA-binding protein structure, illustrating the domains involved in binding DNA.

== Biological function ==
As known before NABP1 plays a very important role in helping keep the genome stable. It does this by binding to single stranded DNA and also by protecting it from damage. It is also involved in many important cellular processes like DNA replication and cell recombination like stated before. This is really where the DNA is either copied or even rearranged. When they then are attached to the exposed DNA strands the NABP1 protein can then help keep the DNA in the correct shape so that it can be copied and then also repaired in the right way.

Also as discussed before NABP1 mainly will work by mainly binding to the regions of single stranded DNA that become very exposed during these normal cellular processes that are going on in the cell. Then these exposed areas are way more likely to be damaged and even so they need to be protected. When the NABP1 binds to these regions it stabilizes the DNA and prevents it from forming the wrong structures or even being degraded by some nucleases. This also will be easier for other proteins in the cell to come in and do their jobs correctly.

NABP1 does play an important role in replication but it is also involved in recombination and also in responding to the replication stress. This really happens when DNA copying is disrupted or degraded. It helps specifically organize and support the tasks of other proteins that are needed for these processes. Also by working hard together with these other proteins the NABP1 that DNA is handled correctly and that the mistakes are rare during these important cellular events. The problem is that if NABP1 is not working properly then the cell can start to build up DNA damage. Genomic instability can be caused by this which is when the DNA becomes more prone to mutations or errors and will cause the cell to die. These kinds of the problems can affect how the cells grow and divide and could even contribute to the bad diseases like cancer. NABP1 is considered an important protein for maintaining the normal cell function and the overall cellular health.

== Role in DNA damage response ==
NABP1 does play a very key role in the cellular response to DNA damage specifically in the situations where the DNA strands are broken and/or exposed out of their pocket. When DNA damage occurs there are regions of the single stranded DNA created which then signals the repair processes to begin. NABP1 then can bind to these exposed regions and helps to stabilize them so that they can also be repaired. After the binding to the damaged DNA NABP1 then helps recruit other proteins that are also involved in DNA repair pathways like homologous recombination. This process is also very important for accurately repairing double strand breaks in DNA. NABP1 can also work then with protein complexes such as the SOSS complex this then helps coordinate the repair response and also ensure that DNA damage is resolved. NABP1 is also involved in signaling pathways that can activate the main DNA damage response. It can help activate proteins like ATM kinase. The ATM kinase plays a major role in controlling the cell cycle checkpoints and repair mechanisms. NABP1 helps cells respond to DNA damage and maintain genomic stability in these checkpoints and processes.

== Interaction partners ==
NABP1 does not just function alone but it can actually interact with several other proteins to help carry out its role in DNA repair. The main partner it has that helps its functions is INTS3. INTS3 will help stabilize specifically NABP1 and also can regulate its activity. NABP1 also can help interact with a protein called C9orf80 and these proteins form part of a larger complex that is involved in DNA damage response. These protein interactions are important because DNA repair does require multiple proteins working together in a coordinated way. NABP1 helps get these proteins to the right sites of DNA damage and supports their activity. Without these interactions between these proteins the repair process would be less efficient and more prone to errors.

== Clinical significance ==
There have been many links between mutations or alterations within the NABP1 protein and certain cellular diseases like cancer. It is known that when processes like cellular repair fail that many problems can occur like mutations which will cause the cell to have problems growing and replicating which will lead to death. Mutations and other instability within the genome are the main causes of cancer. DNA repair is a process that requires multiple proteins and multiple complexes that need to come together with a common goal in mind which is to repair the DNA. NABP1 will help and coordinate the ways that these proteins are brought in and also will make sure they are actually going to the right place.
