= Faggot cell =

Abnormal blood cells in hypergranular APML

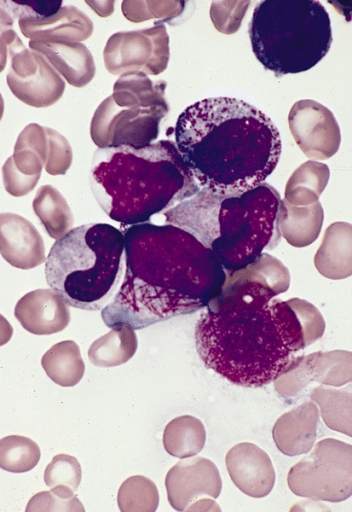
A faggot cell (bottom left of the central cell cluster) with a prominent collection of Auer rods from a patient with acute promyelocytic leukemia.

Faggot cells are cells normally found in the hypergranular form of acute promyelocytic leukemia (FAB - M3). These promyelocytes (not blast cells) have numerous Auer rods in the cytoplasm which gives the appearance of a bundle of sticks, from which the cells are given their name.

== See also ==
- Buttock cell
