= Analogy (band) =

German-Italian rock band

- Origin: Varese, Lombardy, Italy
- Genres: Krautrock, psychedelic rock, progressive rock
- Years active: 1972–1974
- Labels: Produzioni Ventotto, Akarma Records, Garden of Delights, Ohrwaschl Records
- Past members: Martin Thurn; Nicola Pankoff; Wolfgang Schoene; Hermann-Jurgen Nienhaus; Jutta Nienhaus; Rocco Abate
- Website: https://www.analogy.it/

Analogy was a German and Italian psychedelic rock, progressive rock band, active in the 1970s. The band was launched by the guitarist Martin Thurn when attending the European School, Varese. In 1968, Thurn founded a band called Sons of Glove. Other members were Wolfgang Schoene, Thomas Schmidt (later Pell Mell) and Jutta Nienhaus. The band later renamed itself to Joice (due to a misprint later as The Yoice) in 1970 with drummer Hermann-Jürgen Nienhaus (brother of Jutta) and Mauro Rattaggi (bass), the only Italian member of the band. During a music festival in Arona, a spontaneous collaboration happened with keyboarder Nikola Pankoff whilst playing a free interpretation of Pink Floyd's "Atom Heart Mother". Pankoff became a band member thereafter. Finally, in 1972, after becoming a more centered progressive rock band, they decided to change their name to Analogy. Their first release was the single "Sold Out" / "God's Own Land", two songs written by Thurn. At the end of the year, Rattaggi had to join the army and left the band. Schoene changed to the bass guitar.

== Members ==
- Martin Thurn (1950 – 2018) – Guitar
- Nicola Pankoff (1948) – Keyboards
- Wolfgang Schoene (1950) – Bass
- Hermann-Jurgen Nienhaus (1952 – 1990) – Drums
- Jutta Nienhaus (1953 – 2018) – Vocals
- Rocco Abate (1950) – Flute
- Mauro Rattaggi (1952) – Bass

== Discography ==
- Analogy (1972, Produzioni Ventotto)
- The Suite (1993)
- 25 Years Later (1995)
