= Analog Man =

Analog Man may refer to:

- Analog Man (instrument maker), a guitar effects pedals manufacturer
- Analog Man (album), a 2012 album by Joe Walsh
- Analogman, a character in the video game Digimon World
