= Peri-implantitis =

Inflammatory disease

A radiograph two years after implant placement, then seven years later in a heavy smoker, demonstrating progression of bone loss due to peri-implantitis

Peri-implantitis is a destructive inflammatory process affecting the soft and hard tissues surrounding dental implants. The soft tissues become inflamed whereas the alveolar bone (hard tissue), which surrounds the implant for the purposes of retention, is lost over time.

The bone loss involved in peri-implantitis differentiates this condition from peri-mucositis, a reversible inflammatory reaction involving only the soft tissues around the implant.

== Signs and symptoms ==
Peri-implantitis does not present in the same way for all patients. Patients are recommended to regularly attend dental appointments and to seek advice from their dentist if they have any concerns for their oral health.

Before the signs and symptoms are explained, it is worth noting that healthy peri-implant tissue should not be swollen, bleeding, producing pus, or have a reddened appearance.

From a patient's perspective, he/she may notice loosening or wobbling of the implant. This symptom does not usually present at the early stages of peri-implantitis as the implant will still be fused to bone at its deeper aspects. It is more likely that the patient will notice bleeding whilst brushing their teeth. A patient may also notice swelling around the implant, bad breath and/or foul taste.

Clinically, peri-implantitis involves both inflammation of soft tissues and destruction of bone, therefore, there is usually evidence of both bone loss (assessed by a radiograph) and bleeding when nearby tissues are probed, a common finding for soft tissue inflammation. There have been reports of bone loss without any accompanying sign of soft tissue inflammation. Without evidence of bone loss, the diagnosis is restricted to peri-mucositis (see comparison between peri-implantitis and peri-implant mucositis below for more information).

Other reported features include pain and gingival hyperplasia. Pain is thought to be a rare symptom and is usually linked to an acute infection.

=== Bone loss ===
In healthy situation, there should be no sign of bone loss other than potential bone remodelling at the alveolar crest following implant placement.

The shape of the alveolar bone in regions of bone loss varies depending on the buccal-lingual length (or cheek-to-tongue length) of the bone. Where this length is greater than the extent of the peri-implantitis, the region of bone loss can take the shape of a crater, with walls of bone surrounding the pathology; this is the most common presentation of bone loss. Where the buccal-lingual length is smaller, there may be no walls of bone surrounding the pathology.

=== Probing ===
Bleeding on probing is considered normal whilst tissues are healing shortly after implant placement, however, if bleeding is present months or years after placement, inflammation should be suspected. Other features which may be present whilst probing include pus, the presence of a pocket around the implant and/or recession of the gums. The dental professional may also notice swelling and redness of the gums, the latter of which is termed erythema.

During probing, the pocket depth around an implant is typically greater than around natural teeth. Also, the value for the pocket depth around an implant is variable in health, therefore, diagnosis of a pocket is reliant on a change in pocket depth when comparing measurements from different appointments. For this reason, a Basic Periodontal Examination (BPE) is not appropriate, and a 4 or 6 point pocket chart is instead recommended.

Below is a summary table of signs and symptoms associated with peri-implantitis.

Signs and symptoms of peri-implantitis
Signs (identified by health professional)	Symptoms (patient presents with these issues)
Bleeding (and possible discharge of pus) on probing	Bleeding when brushing teeth
Swelling	Swelling around implant
Pocket formation and/or gum recession	Foul taste
Redness (erythema)	Bad breath
Hyperplasia	Loose implant
Radiographic evidence of bone loss around implant	Pain (rare)

== Causes & pathology ==
Studies in both human and animal specimens found that the presence of plaque and its conglomeration around tissues invariably concluded in inflammation around the peri-implant soft tissue.

To find the pathology of peri-implantitis, experiments were compared to peri-mucositis, and found that in peri-implantitis, there were more neutrophil granulocytes and a bigger proportion of (CD19+) B-cells. Similarly in periodontitis, peri-implantitis lesions contained many plasma cells and lymphocytes, however there were a larger ratio of macrophage cells and leukocytic cells.

== Risk factors ==
The risk factors have been sub-divided to distinguish those with strong supporting evidence (below the sub-heading 'risk factor') from those with conflicting evidence (below the sub-heading 'potential risk factors').

=== Risk factors ===
- Poor plaque control - this highlights the importance of cleaning the tissues around an implant between dental appointments. It is understood that patients sometimes feel discomfort whilst brushing around implants and are advised to speak to their dentist about this. Also, patients may sometimes be unable to access some sites for cleaning.

Lack of regular maintenance therapy. To avoid this, regular dental visits should be arranged to enable early detection and management of peri-implantitis.

- Titanium implant degradation products in the form of microparticles, which have infiltrated the peri-implant tissue and peri-implant bacterial plaque. These particles have occasionally been found in small concentrations in healthy peri-implant tissue; however, their concentration was reported to be significantly higher in individuals with peri-implantitis. These titanium particles are internalized by phagocytes and have been found to elicit strong pro-inflammatory effects and bone resorption in preclinical models suggesting causative implications to peri-implantitis.

=== Potential risk factors ===
Diabetes mellitus (commonly known as type 1 and type 2 diabetes)

Excess cement. The cement is used to retain the implant, although its potentially rough surface may aid with plaque retention. Therefore, any residual cement surrounding the implant abutment interface can give rise to peri-implantitis. The alternative to cement is a screw-retained implant, although some studies have reported a higher risk of peri-implantitis with these compared to cement-retained implants.

Further research is required to establish whether the following are indeed risk factors for peri-implantitis:

- Width of keratinised mucosa around the implant. Several studies identified more plaque and inflammation where the keratinised mucosa is 2mm or less in width, although it is unclear if this translates to a higher risk of peri-implantitis.
- Genetics
- Systemic conditions other than diabetes, such as cardiovascular disease and rheumatoid arthritis
- Iatrogenic factors such as implant positioning and bone grafting
- Occlusal overloading of the implant

Despite its association with a number of oral maladies, there is some debate as to whether smoking is a risk factor for peri-implantitis despite its association with periodontitis.

== Peri-implantitis vs peri-implant mucositis ==
Peri-implant disease is an umbrella term for inflammatory diseases of tissues including both peri-implantitis and peri-implant mucositis. Peri-implant mucositis is a disease where inflammation is limited to the surrounding mucosa of an implant whereby peri-implantitis an inflammatory disease affecting mucosa as well as bone.

In health, peri-implant mucosa is described as "oral epithelium extending into a non-keratinised barrier epithelium with basal lamina and hemidesmosomes facing the implant or abutment surface". Healthy peri-implant mucosa becomes peri-implant mucositis when biofilms housing bacteria colonise implants and elicit an inflammatory response. The characteristics of peri-implant mucositis are very similar to that of gingivitis: redness, swelling and inflammation. In order to diagnose peri-implant mucositis, bleeding in response to probing of the gingiva must be identified. Research has stated that the cause of this disease is similar to that of gingivitis: inadequate plaque removal in areas surrounding the implant. Zitzmann et al. (2001) enlisted 12 partially dentate participants with implants who had healthy periodontal tissues. They were asked to refrain from carrying out oral hygiene for a period of 3 weeks. The results of this study demonstrated that the accumulation of plaque had led to the development of inflammation coupled with an increase in the gingival infiltrate containing immune cells

Research has highlighted that the mechanisms of peri-implant mucositis and gingivitis are very similar with bacterial invasion from plaque triggering redness, swelling and inflammation within soft tissues. Peri-implant mucositis has the ability to transform into peri-implantitis if no action is taken to reverse signs of peri-implant mucositis, similar to gingivitis and periodontitis. To reverse peri-implant mucositis, good oral hygiene must be performed regularly to remove plaque which initiated this disease.

Peri-implant mucositis becomes peri-implantitis when bone resorption is identified around the implant on a radiograph as well as all the signs associated with peri-implant mucositis is seen. Often, pus may also exude from the tissues surrounding the implant. However, mobility of the implant is not a sign of peri-implantitis as this disease begins at the margins of the implant. Only in the most severe cases of peri-implantitis, implant mobility may be observed where minimal bone tissue remains.

== Prevention ==
If peri-implant mucositis is present, it must be treated to deter it from progressing to peri-implantitis, for which currently, there are no treatments to reverse its effects.

Patients must carry out plaque removal regularly to prevent and treat peri-implant mucositis by the act of tooth-brushing. Dentists must deliver oral hygiene instruction to ensure their patients are removing plaque sufficiently as well as removing their calculus which is a known plaque-retentive factor. The prognosis for implants are significantly higher in those who do smoke compared to those who not do. Therefore, patients should be encouraged to quit smoking in order to achieve the best results.

Dentists are responsible for ensuring that different elements of the implant should be of the correct size to avoid creating additional surfaces which bacteria can colonise. Margins of the restoration should be placed supra-gingivally in order to remove any extruded cement during placement. After implant placement, dentists must carefully and regularly monitor the health of the peri-implant mucosa at suitable intervals, e.g. every 3/6/12 months.

== Treatment ==
It is challenging to treat peri-implantitis. Depending on the nature of the disease, treatment can vary significantly – from non-surgical therapy with an aim to control the infection and detoxify the implant surface, to surgical procedures to regenerate the alveolar bone that has been lost.

Due to the screw-shaped design and titanium surface modifications of the implants, mechanical debridement on the surface of the implant is ineffective in removing all adhering microorganisms. Therefore, to enhance the non-surgical treatment options of peri-implantitis, mechanical debridement can be used in combination with antiseptic, antibiotic therapy and/or resective or regenerative surgery. The combination of treatments can vary depending on the severity of the peri-implantitis, and cumulative interceptive support therapy provides guidance in this aspect.

Cumulative interceptive supportive therapy, a protocol of therapeutic measures, provides guidance for clinicians to decide which regime should be used to treat peri-implantitis, depending on the mucosal condition (whether there is a presence of dental plaque, bleeding on gentle probing, suppuration), peri-implant probing depth, and evidence of radiographic bone loss.

=== Mechanical debridement ===
To prevent roughening and damaging of the implant surface, ultrasonic scalers with a non-metallic tip or resin/carbon fiber curettes are used for calculus removal. Conventional steel curettes or ultrasonic instruments with metal tips should be avoided as implant surface can be damaged, and any residual marks increase implant susceptibility to plaque accumulation in the future. Polishing with rubber cups and polishing paste also aids in plaque removal.

=== Antiseptic treatment ===
This is performed in conjunction with mechanical debridement based on an empirical basis. The most commonly employed antiseptic applied is chlorhexidine digluconate, an antimicrobial commonly used in periodontitis. This antiseptic has been recommended to maintain satisfactory plaque control around implants primarily based on data from studies around teeth, but long-term use is not recommended due to adverse events including staining of teeth and oral tissues and altered taste sensation. Chlorhexidine may slightly improve the mucosal condition in regards to bleeding on probing, which is a measure of tissue inflammation. 1% concentration of hydrogen peroxide has shown to be as effective as chlorhexidine without the side effect of staining. Recently, concerns have been raised regarding the direct application of chlorhexidine on implant surfaces during the treatment of peri-implant inflammation, because it becomes adsorbed on the implants and exhibits strong cytotoxic effects to fibroblasts and osteoblasts that may prevent peri-implantitis healing. However, current preponderance of evidence supports that the long-term antimicrobial effect of the use of chlorhexidine significantly outweighs the comparatively brief period of cytotoxicity.

=== Antibiotic treatment ===
This approach is aiming to eliminate or at least significantly reduce the pathogens in the submucosal biofilm. An antibiotic targeting gram-negative anaerobic bacteria – e.g. metronidazole or ornidazole is administered during the last ten days of antiseptic treatment, allowing peri-implant infection to be treated successfully and remain stable. Reinfection is subsequently prevented by instituting prophylactic procedures. Alternatively, tetracycline periodontal fibers can be inserted locally for a period of ten days; this creates an environment of sustained high dose of the antimicrobial agent at the affected site for several days. Another method is to use minocycline microspheres in conjunction with mechanical debridement; this has shown to improve probing depths, but the treatment may have to be repeated in future. Oral systemic antibiotic intake has not shown a permanent solution without adjunct therapy being mechanical and/or local application of doxycycline and 1% hydrogen peroxide.

=== Surgical treatment ===
Surgical flap management with either (or both) resective and regenerative approaches is only considered if infection is controlled successfully. This treatment is used to restore the bony support through guided bone regeneration, or to reshape the peri-implant soft tissue. This also helps in comprehensive debridement and local decontamination of the affected implant. It is vital to consider the aesthetic and morphological characteristics of the peri-implant lesion when considering resective surgical techniques.

== Current research ==
Preventing peri-implantitis using Biomaterial strategies to prevent or eliminate initial bacterial attachment are currently being researched. These biomaterial strategies are aiming at suppressing or inhibiting bacterial colonization of implant surfaces in favor or host cells and tissues. Additionally, new studies suggest that implant-specific instruments need to be used that reduce peri-implant bacteria while maintaining the integrity of the surface of the implant. In contrast, if the implant surface is damaged by abrasive instruments, such as titanium brushes, titanium microparticles are released to the peri-implant environment that contribute to inflammation. Various combinations of strategies like antimicrobial surfaces and or delivery mechanisms coupled with methods to favor stable osseointegration and permucosal seal are being developed, these types of surfaces will be most effective in developing implants resistant to peri-implant disease.
