= Analogue (theatre company) =

Company logo

Analogue is a British multi-disciplinary performance company based in the South-East of England. The company consists of Artistic Directors Liam Jarvis and Hannah Barker, and Producer Ric Watts. The work of the company is led by the directors and created collectively with "Associate Artists" who are invited to collaborate on new projects.

A company mainly focusing on progressive theatre and exploring contemporary social issues, they work with multiple companies both in the UK and overseas, whilst citing companies such as Complicité and Robert LePage as influences, in order to create multimedia theatre that appeals to the more modern generation.

== Funding ==
Other than revenue from ticket sales, Analogue has received funding on a project-by-project basis from different sources:

- Arts Council England
- LCACE
- Royal Holloway University
- Wellcome Trust

== Past Productions ==
=== Mile End ===
Mile End, Analogues first production, was performed at the Edinburgh Festival in 2007. It won a Fringe First Award & The Arches Brick Award (Short-listed for a Total Theatre Award, Carol Tambor Award, Edinburgh International Festival Award, The Stage Award ('Best Ensemble') and was nominated for a FringeReview Award. The show, following this success, toured nationally in the first part of the following year and toured internationally in Autumn 2008.

As the artist director Liam Jarvis stated in a TotalTheatre article about their second devised work entitled Beachy Head, "Our debut production, Mile End, began life as an investigation into the tragic death of an innocent commuter, Christophe Duclos, who in 2002 was pushed in front of a tube train in the rush hour at Mile End Station by Stephen Soans-Wade. Stephen, from Poplar, East London, had tried to get himself sectioned under the Mental Health Act, but psychiatrists had decided that whilst he had displayed some abnormal and antisocial traits, they were not sufficient to have him detained. His threats of violence were largely ignored, with devastating consequences."

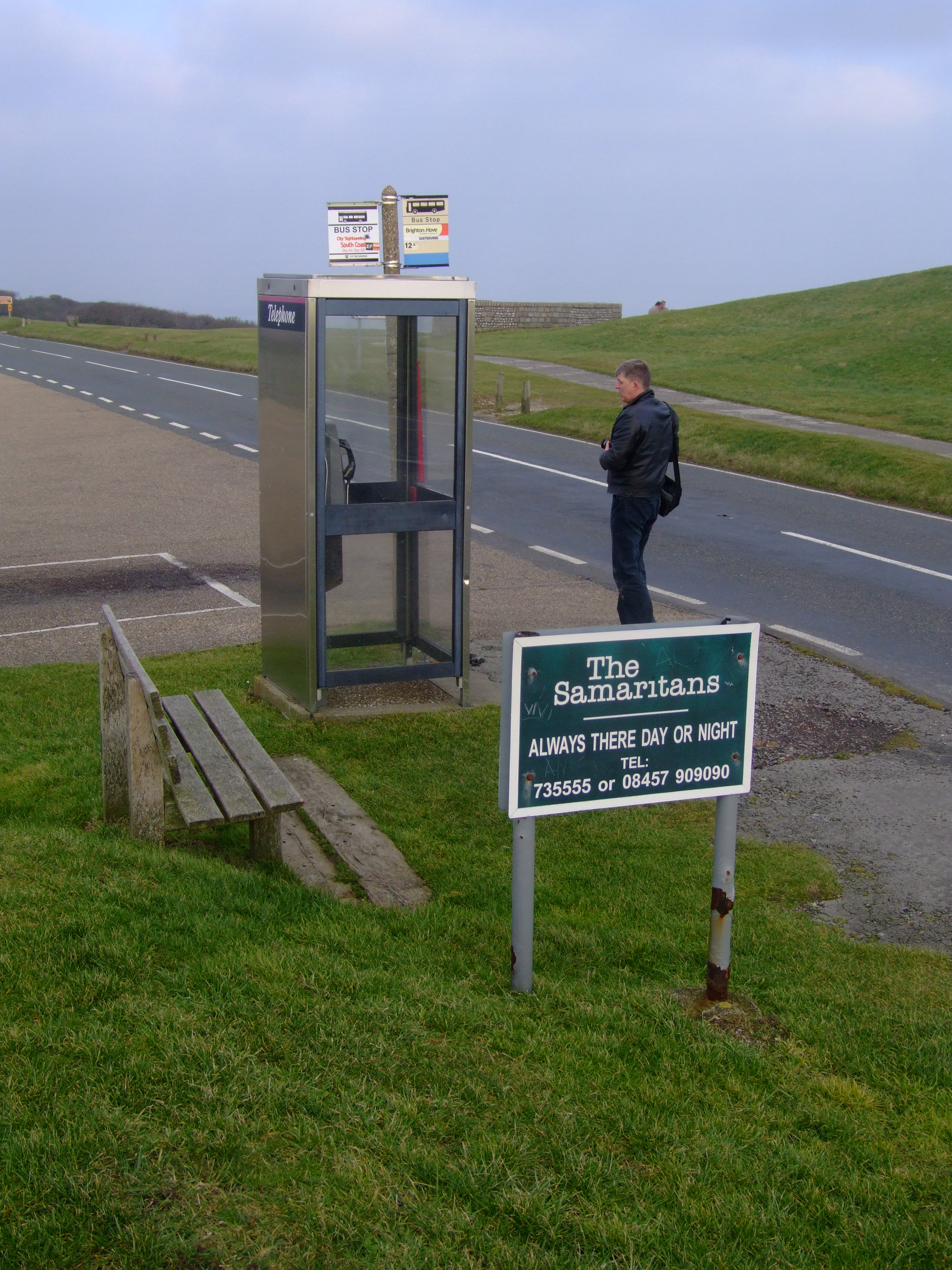
The public phone box and accompanying Samaritans sign that inspired Beachy Head

=== Beachy Head ===
Beachy Head, the second part of Analogue's trilogy, was performed at the Edinburgh Fringe in August 2009. Inspired by an image of a public telephone box and accompanying Samaritans sign positioned at Beachy Head, the play set out to deal with the concept of suicide, one of the main reasons Beachy Head is famous.

In an article about the reasons behind the plays creation, the artistic director Liam Jarvis wrote "[Beachy Head] began life as a new photograph we saw of a solitary telephone box, installed on the cliff tops in 1976 alongside a sign for the Samaritans that reads "ALWAYS THERE DAY OR NIGHT". The image was ambivalent; bleak and hopeful in the same breath. We can never know precisely what conversations this phone box had witnessed. But the idea remained safely distant until we visited Beachy Head on a field trip in September 2007 and found ourselves much closer to the subject matter than we'd anticipated – from the gardens of the Beachy Head Inn we witnessed the sight of the police and local chaplaincy comforting the grieving relatives of a woman who had jumped earlier that morning."

=== 2401 Objects ===
2401 Objects, tells the story of the life of Henry Molaison, who underwent an experimental surgery on 1 September 1953 to attempt to rid himself of his increasingly devastating effects of frequent blackouts and seizures that came with his Epilepsy. The play, a collaboration between Analogue and the German theatre Oldenburgisches Statatstheater, was first performed in Germany on 17 June 2011, before its UK premiere at the Pleasance Courtyard in the Edinburgh Festival Fringe on 3 August 2011, where it won a Scotsman Fringe First award for its writing.

The play opens and closes with recorded dialogue from Neuroanatomist Dr Jacopo Annese, the director of the Brain Observatory in San Diego. Dr Annese is accredited with "over a 53 hour-period in December 2009, dissected Henry's brain into the 2401 pieces that gives the play its name."

=== Sleepless ===
Sleepless was written by Hannah Barker and Liam Jarvis, and was performed in Shoreditch Town Hall in 2016. The story, as stated on Shoreditch Town Halls website "inspired by the extraordinary true story of a family cursed with a rare genetic disease that cruelly deprives members of sleep until they die, a story that sits at the crossroads of two cutting edge areas of science: sleep research and prion theory, and begs the broader question: how do we decide the value of a human life?"

=== Stowaway ===
Stowaway, written by Hannah Barker and Lewis Hetherington, toured the UK throughout the months of April and May 2016. The play follows the story of "a man from India who moves to the UAE for the promise of work and prosperity. When he finds himself trapped within a Dubai labour camp, with his passport and wages withheld from him, he hides in the wheel well of a plane bound for the UK, in a bid for a better life.".
