= Analogy (album) =

Studio album by Analogy
- Released: June 1972
- Recorded: 1972 at Mondial Sound Studios, Milan
- Genre: Progressive rock
- Length: 48:23
- Label: Produzioni Ventotto
- Producers: Aldo Pagani, Analogy

Analogy chronology
Analogy (1972)	The Suite (1973)

Professional ratings
Review scores
Source	Rating
Allmusic	4/5 stars

Analogy is the debut studio album by the band Analogy. The album was reissued in 2004 on Akarma Records.

== Track listing ==
All tracks were written by Martin Thurn, unless otherwise noted.

1. Dark Reflections - 7:07
2. Weeping My Endure (John Milton, Thurn) - 4:54
3. Indian Meditation - 4:22
4. Tin's Song - 1:41
5. Analogy (Analogy) - 9:50
6. The Year's at the Spring (Elizabeth Barrett Browning, Thurn, Jutta Nienhaus) - 4:43
7. Pan-Am Flight 249 (Thurn, Nienhaus) - 5:18

=== 2001 Reissue Bonus Track ===
1. Milan on a Sunday Morning (Analogy) - 6:07
