= Analog (TV program) =

- Presented by: Gordon Jones
- Country of origin: Canada
- Original language: English
- No. of seasons: 1

Production
- Executive producer: Doug Lower
- Producer: Eric McLeery
- Running time: 15–30 minutes

Original release
- Network: CBC Television
- Release: 11 October 1970 – 25 June 1972

Analog is a Canadian business informational television program that aired on CBC Television from 1971 to 1972.

== Premise ==
This program concerned business and economic matters such as stock markets, presented for a general audience. Gordon Jones was its host.

== Scheduling ==
The program aired on Sundays at 1:00 p.m. (Eastern) on a 15-minute time slot from its debut (11 October 1970) until 27 June 1971. From 26 September 1971, it aired as a half-hour series until the final program aired 25 June 1972.

== See also ==
- Venture
