= Recombination =

Recombination may refer to:

- Carrier generation and recombination, in semiconductors, the cancellation of mobile charge carriers (electrons and holes)
- Genetic recombination, the process by which genetic material is broken and joined to other genetic material
  - Bacterial recombination
  - Homologous recombination
- Recombination (evolutionary algorithm), also called crossover
- Plasma recombination, the formation of neutral atoms from the capture of free electrons by the cations in a plasma
- Recombination (chemistry), the opposite of dissociation
- Cage effect, a special kind of recombination reaction that appears in condensed phases
- Recombination (cosmology), the time at which protons and electrons formed neutral hydrogen in the timeline of the Big Bang
