= Bleeding on probing =

Dental term

Bleeding on probing (BoP) which is also known as bleeding gums or gingival bleeding is a term used by dentists and dental hygienists when referring to bleeding that is induced by gentle manipulation of the tissue at the depth of the gingival sulcus, or interface between the gingiva and a tooth. BoP is a sign of periodontal inflammation and indicates some sort of destruction and erosion to the lining of the sulcus or the ulceration of sulcular epithelium. The blood comes from lamina propria after the ulceration of the lining. BoP seems to be correlated with Periodontal Inflamed Surface Area (PISA).

== Causes ==
There are many possible causes of gingival bleeding. The main cause of gingival bleeding is the formation and accumulation of plaque at the gum line due to improper brushing and flossing of teeth. The hardened form of plaque is calculus. An advanced form of gingivitis as a result of formation of plaque is periodontitis. Other conditions associated with gingival bleeding include:

- Tooth or gum infection
- Diabetes mellitus
- Hypertension
- Idiopathic thrombocytopenic purpura
- Leukemia
- Malnutrition
- Aspirin and anticoagulants therapy
- Hormonal changes during puberty and pregnancy
- Iron overload

Other less common causes are:

- Vitamin B_{12} or folate deficiency anemia
- vitamin C deficiency (scurvy) and vitamin K deficiency
- dengue fever

== Diagnosis ==
An examination by the dentist or dental hygienist should be sufficient to rule out the issues such as malnutrition and puberty. Additional corresponding diagnosis tests to certain potential disease may be required. This includes oral glucose tolerance test for diabetes mellitus, blood studies, human gonadotrophin levels for pregnancy, and X-rays for teeth and jaw bones.

In order to determine the periodontal health of a patient, the dentist or dental hygienist records the sulcular depths of the gingiva and observes any bleeding on probing. This is often accomplished with the use of a periodontal probe. Alternatively, dental floss may also be used to assess the Gingival bleeding index. It is used as an initial evaluation on patient's periodontal health especially to measure gingivitis. The number of bleeding sites is used to calculate the gingival bleeding score.

Peer-reviewed dental literature thoroughly establishes that bleeding on probing is a poor positive predictor of periodontal disease, but conversely lack of bleeding is a very strong negative predictor. The clinical interpretation of this research is that while BOP presence may not indicate periodontal disease, continued absence of BOP is a strong predictor (approximately 98%) of continued periodontal health.

== Treatment ==
- Corresponding treatments for diagnosed diseases should be taken as first priority.
- Dentist or hygienists should be visited once every three months for plaque removal.
- Soft-bristle toothbrush is recommended for brushing teeth. Hard-bristled toothbrushes may be softened by leaving under hot running water (very hot) before brushing every time, followed by gentle brushing.
- Flossing twice a day can prevent the building up of plaque.
- Tobacco should be avoided as tobacco can aggravate the bleeding gums.
- A balanced healthy diet should also be taken into account.
- A physiotherapy programme using over-the-counter toothpaste with triclosan should be used with home care.

If there is persistent continuation of inflammation and bleeding, a prescription of antiplaque rinse may be useful.
