= Charles Edward Wallis =

English physician and dental surgeon

Charles Edward Wallis MRCS LRCP LDS
- Born: 26 March 1869; Lambeth, London, England
- Died: 4 January 1927 (aged 57)
- Education: Dental Hospital of London; King's College Hospital
- Occupations: Physician, dentist
- Organisation: British Dental Association
- Known for: Dental health of children

Charles Edward Wallis (26 March 1869 – 4 January 1927), otherwise known as the 'father' of the London School Dental Service, was a physician and dental surgeon in London in the early 20th century. As one of the first assistant medical officers to London County Council, his research led to the establishment of a school dental treatment service and an improvement in child welfare.

He was an active member of the British Dental Association (BDA) and a keen historian of medicine, participating in the activities of the Royal Society of Medicine's (RSM) History of Medicine Section, later renamed society.

Between his medical and dental training, Wallis took up a post as a ship’s surgeon, a position he pursued again later to travel much of the world and learn dental procedures. He was particularly skilled in the bilateral molar extraction before the use of local anaesthetic.

As a King's College Hospital dental surgeon, Wallis also published extensively in the British Dental Journal, ultimately being an important part of its editorial board.

His legacy is honoured through a fund left by his brother to the RSM.

== Early life ==
Charles Edward Wallis was born on 26 March 1869 in Lambeth, his mother being called Fanny Margaret and his father, Augustus Wallis, an insurance clerk. His early education was at Bedford Grammar School, following which he gained the conjoint medical diploma from King's College Hospital in 1894.

== Early medical career ==
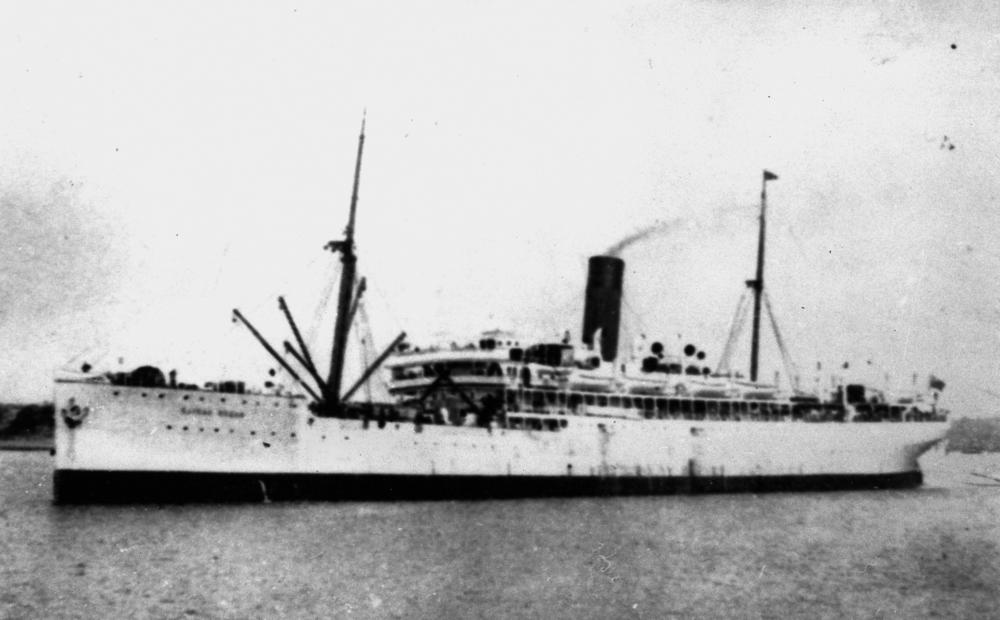
Union-Castle liner SS Garth Castle, built in Glasgow in 1920 and scrapped in 1939.

Wallis became a ship's surgeon on the Royal Microscopical Society's RMS Garth Castle (Union-Castle Line), after fulfilling two house appointments. Later, he would use vacations to travel to Canada, the United States, South Africa and the Antarctic and learn new dental techniques. Subsequently, he went to study in Paris and then again in London.

At one time, Wallis was Joseph Lister's dresser (assistant).

== Dental career ==
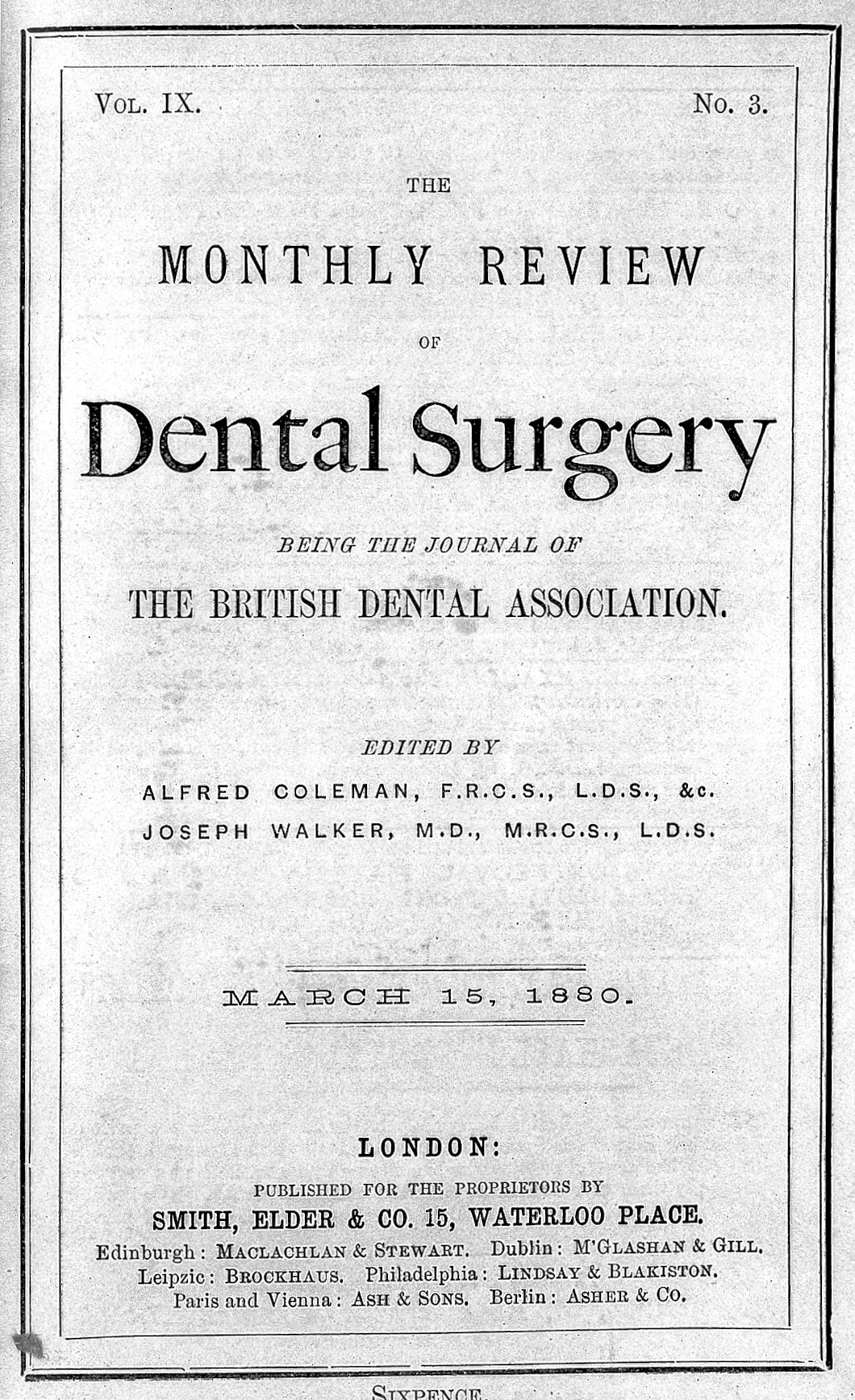
Journal of British Dental Association, retaining previous title Monthly review of Dental Surgery.

In 1897, he gained the Licentiate in Dental Surgery of the Royal College of Surgeons of England from the Dental Hospital of London, later named the Royal Dental Hospital which subsequently merged with Guy's Dental School and became the United Medical and Dental Schools of Guy's and St Thomas' Hospitals. Wallis then set up practice in Queen Anne Street, London and joined the BDA where he remained an active member for 22 years. He wrote extensively for the British Dental Journal from 1908 to 1919 and became chairman of its editorial board from 1914. In 1899, Wallis was appointed dental assistant at KCH and subsequently took over from Professor Swayne Underwood as dental surgeon in 1911.

In 1905, Wallis was appointed assistant medical officer to the London County Council. Wallis was mainly responsible for the formation of its school dental service.

=== Children’s dental hygiene ===
Prior to the advent of local anaesthesia, Wallis would perform the bilateral molar extraction by simultaneously pulling out the two teeth whilst an assistant held the head. This avoided experiencing pain twice.

In addition to his concern with dental health, as an assistant medical officer to the London County Council, Wallis maintained his overall interest in child welfare.

== History of medicine ==
Wallis was interested in archaeology and history. Writing extensively on the history of dentistry and sitting next to Lilian Lindsay at meetings, Wallis spent a considerable time with activities related to the history of medicine section at the Royal Society of Medicine in Wimpole Street, London.

He was considered expert in the histories of Paris and London and published on dentistry in ancient times.

== Legacy ==
Wallis died at the age of 59 years in King’s College hospital on Tuesday 4 January 1927 from bronchopneumonia. He left with his writing an unfinished history of Harley Street. His brother, Ferdinand bestowed a C.E Wallis prize in preventive dentistry for undergraduates at King’s. Ferdinand Wallis also presented the RSM with £100 to establish a ‘CE Wallis Lecture’ on the history of dentistry in memory of his brother. This is jointly arranged by the odontology section of the RSM and the history of medicine society and is given every five years. It was emphasised that the lecturer must be a fluent and interesting speaker and should provide “illustrations such as lantern slides”. The first person given the honour of presenting the memorial lecture was Lilian Lindsay. She remembered Wallis as a personal friend who sat next to her at meetings of the History of Medicine Section at the RSM. Other notable speakers have included W. Fraser-Moodie in 1971, J. R. Garrett in 1975, Frank Colyer, Zachary Cope and Stanley Gelbier.

Tributes continued through to 2017 with Malcolm Bishop recalling how Wallis was a model mover and shaker of his time. Previously, John Davy Rolleston had prepared a special reference to Wallis in Philadelphia in 1926, at the 7th International Dental Congress called 'Recollections of Lister'. Following Wallis's death, Dr E Graham Little MP, honoured a lecture on the 'Art of War' which Wallis had centred on the Latin text De Re Militari (Concerning Military Matters). Lilian Lindsay commented how "his retentive memory provided material for his entertainment of children whom he delighted with his stories and recitations".

He became known as the 'father' of the London School Dental Service.

== List of past C. E. Wallis lectures ==
Past lectures and speakers include:

Years	Name	Lecture title	Comments	Image
1933	Lilian Lindsay	The Sun, the Tooth drawer and the Saint		
1938	Sir Frank Colyer	Old Instruments for the Extraction of Teeth		
1944	John Davy Rolleston	The Folk-lore of Toothache		
1949	Frederic Nicklin Doubleday	The Contribution of King’s College, London to the science of dentistry		
1954	Humphrey Humphreys	Dental Operations Practised in Primitive Communities		
1959	Ronald A. Cohen	Methods and Materials Used for Artificial Teeth		
1964	Zachary Cope	The Making of the Dental Profession in Britain		
1970	W Fraser-Moodie	Struggle against Infection		
1975	John R Garrett	Changing Attitudes on Salivary Secretion – A Short History on Spit		
1981	J Archie Donaldson	The Life and Times of Sidney Spokes		
1984	J T Blackwood	A New Look at the Use of Analgesics in Dentistry		
1990	Bertram Cohen	Observation, induction and deduction – John Hunter, Pathologist		
1994	Gordon Seward	The Elephant Man		
1999	Caroline Grigson	John Hunter’s London		
2006	Stanley Gelbier	Peripatetic Dentistry: An Out of Surgery Experience		
2011	Adrian Padfield	Fifty Years of Dental Chair Anaesthesia and Mortality		
2017	Malcolm Bishop	The ebb and flow of ethical governance in a medical sub-specialty: Dentistry in the 18th, 19th and 20th centuries		

== Selected publications ==
- An atlas of dental extractions with notes on the causes and relief of dental pain: designed for the use of medical students and practitioners. J. & A. Churchill, London, 1909.
