= Stanley Gelbier =

British dentist (born 1935)

Professor Stanley Gelbier
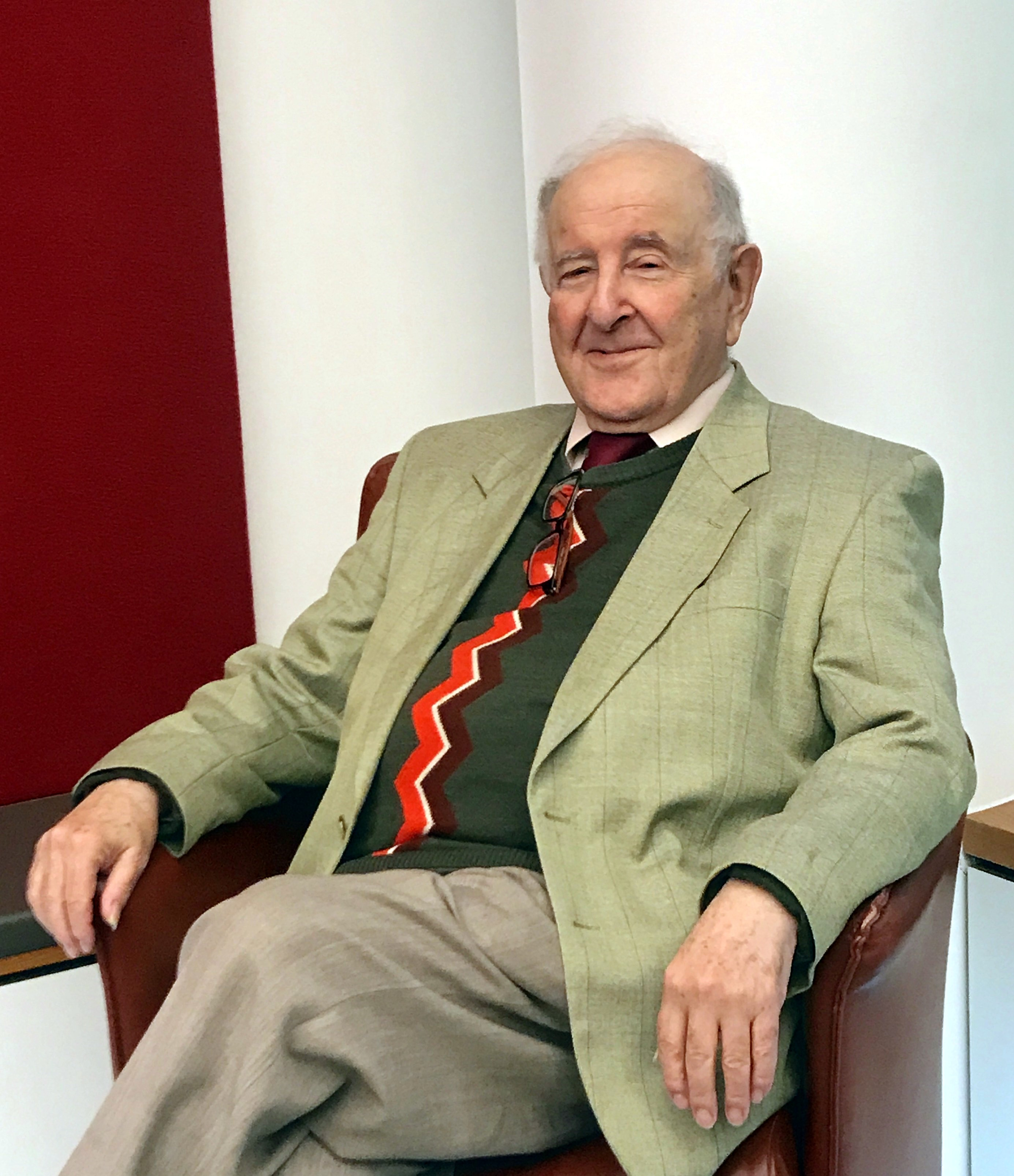
- Born: November 1935 (age 90); Clapton, London, England
- Education: Royal Dental Hospital
- Known for: Dental public health; history of dentistry
- Scientific career
- Fields: Community dentistry
- Institutions: Department of dental public health, King's College London

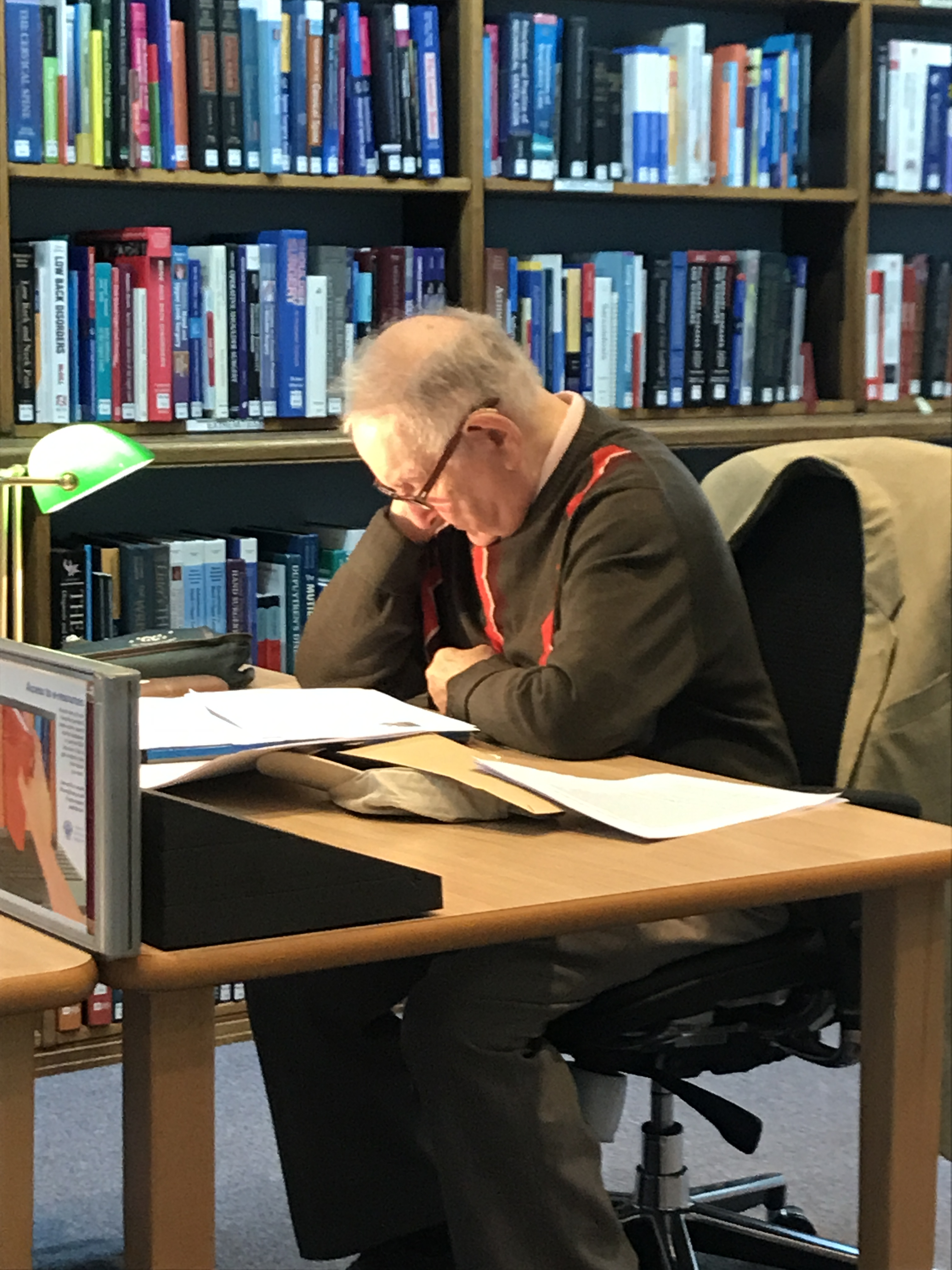
Gelbier reading in the Royal Society of Medicine library, 2017

Stanley Gelbier (born November 1935) is emeritus professor of dental public health and honorary professor of the history of dentistry at King's College London. He is a past president of the History of Medicine Society, and the former curator of the British Dental Association's museum.

As a Jew he experienced antisemitism in his youth. His pre-clinical training was completed at King's College and his clinical dental training at the Royal Dental Hospital (1957–61). In 1962, he was appointed house surgeon to the orthodontic and children’s departments at the Royal Dental Hospital. That year he wrote a paper for the Royal Dental Hospital Magazine on "Tooth Erosion in a Boy Consuming a High Intake of Cola and Similar Drinks". He was later assigned to the Department of Children’s dentistry, followed by a post at The London Hospital, Whitechapel, and then a lectureship in child dental health at The London Hospital Medical College.

In 2002, Gelbier was awarded the BDA's John Tomes Medal, which honours members of the dental profession and of scientific importance.

== Early life and family ==
Stanley Gelbier was born in November 1935 at Clapton Common, Hackney, London. He is Jewish, and experienced antisemitism in his youth after the end of the Second World War. He received his pre-clinical training at King's College and clinical dental training at the Royal Dental Hospital (1957–61). Subsequently, he gained a licence in Dental Surgery from the Royal College of Surgeons in 1961.

== Career ==
In 1961, Gelbier started his first job as school dental officer for Essex, where he remained until 1967. During some of this time, he also took on part-time dental work in Stoke Newington.

In 1962, he was appointed house surgeon to the orthodontic and children’s departments at the Royal Dental Hospital. Gelbier recalls in his memoirs that during this post, many years before other articles on the damage to teeth by sugary drinks, he was encouraged to write his first paper about a child with tooth decay who drank about 8 bottles of cola a day. Subsequently he was assigned to the Department of Children’s dentistry, followed by a post at The London Hospital, Whitechapel, and then a lectureship in child dental health at The London Hospital Medical College. He was inspired by the founder of dental clinics for children with disabilities, Neil Swallow, amongst others.

Gelbier was professor and head of the department of dental public health at King's College London from 1990 to 2002. He then became professor emeritus there. He was the first dentist to receive an honorary fellowship from the Faculty of Public Health (then PH Medicine). Since 2010 he has been honorary professor in the history of dentistry at King's. He is a past president of the History of Medicine Society, and the former curator of the British Dental Association's museum.

== Dental history ==
Gelbier was appointed assistant curator of the British Dental Association Museum in 1982 and full curator in 1987. He became the first U.K. honorary professor in the history of dentistry. His research has ranged from care of pauper children to the lives and work of leading dentists. His historical writings have covered the British Paedodontic Society, the International Association of Dentistry for Children and the British Society of Oral Health and Disability.

In 2002, Gelbier was awarded the BDA's John Tomes Medal, which honours members of the dental profession and of scientific importance. The BDA later honoured Gelbier with life membership in December 2007. In 2016, Gelbier was presented with the American Academy of the History of Dentistry's Hayden Harris Award by Dr Sheldon Peck.

He is the author of numerous works about dentistry and its history. In 1962 he wrote a paper for the Royal Dental Hospital Magazine on "Tooth Erosion in a Boy Consuming a High Intake of Cola and Similar Drinks". He has written biographies of notable dentists including Sydney William Garne of Ceylon and James Smith Turner of the BDA.

Gelbier co-organised the Witness Seminars on the history of dentistry at the BDA as part of the John McLean Archive of Living Dental History, funded by a bequest from the estate of dental pioneer John Walford McLean. Gelbier is the joint editor with Nairn Wilson of the transcripts of all five of the seminars which were published by the BDA in 2014.

== Retirement ==
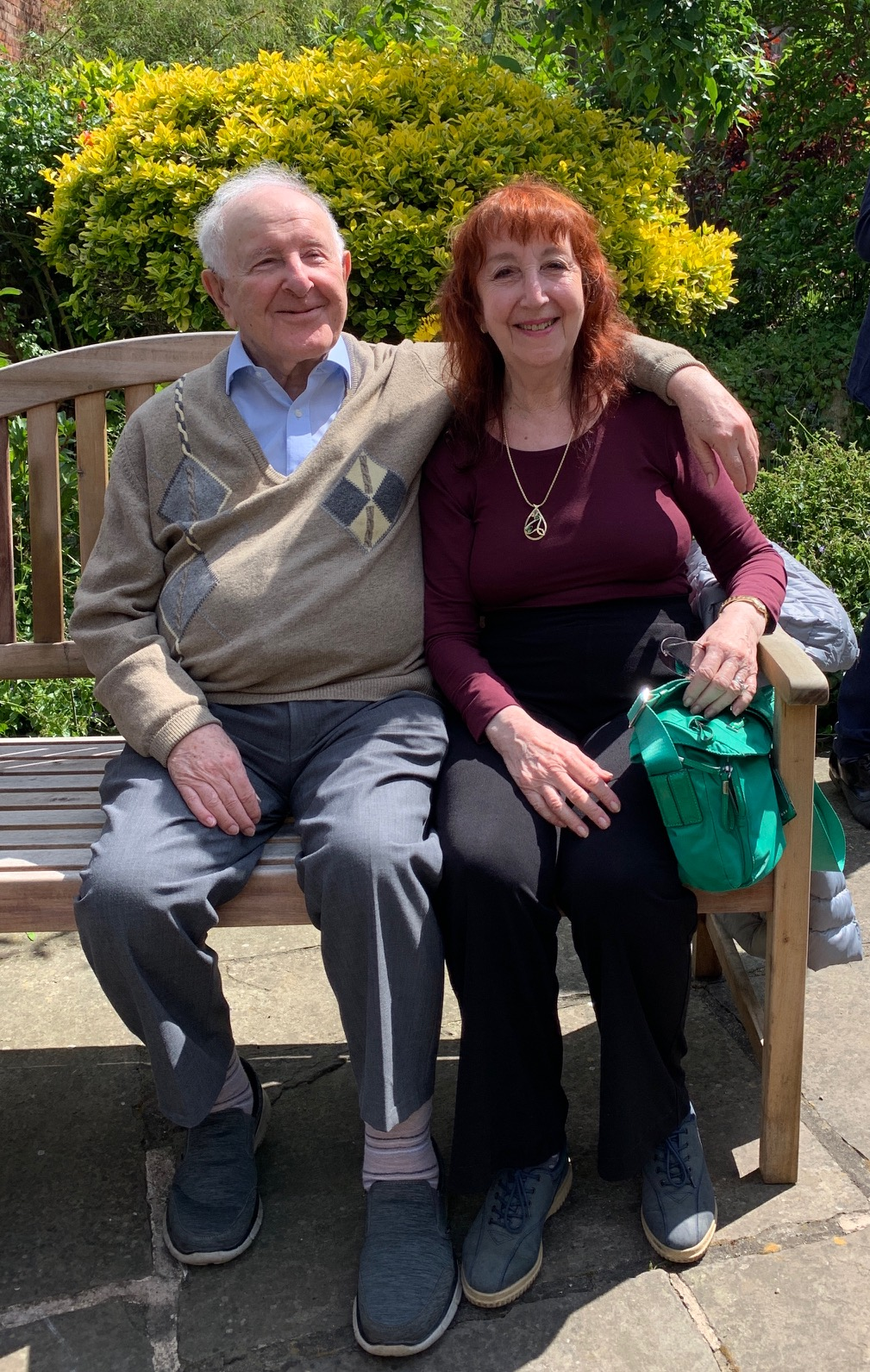
Professor Stanley Gelbier and his wife (2019)

In 2015, Gelbier retired after 33 years as deputy and then honorary curator of the British Dental Association Museum. In 2017 he published his autobiography, From Public Health Dentist to Dental Historian.

== Selected publications ==
=== Witness seminar series ===
All BDA, London, 2014. Edited by Stanley Gelbier and Nairn Wilson.

- The Regulation of the Dental Profession by the General Dental Council
- The Changes in Dentistry Since 1948
- The Changing Role of Dental Care Professionals
- The History and Impact of Development in Dental Biomaterials Over the Last 60 Years
- The Dental Press

=== Other ===
- "Tooth Erosion in a Boy Consuming a High Intake of Cola and Similar Drinks", Royal Dental Hospital Magazine, December 1962, pp. 12–14.
- "Frederick Breese and London's first school dental clinic", British Dental Journal, Vol. 151 (1981), pp. 309–311.
- "History of dentistry in Japan and the Tokyo Dental College", Dental Historian, Vol. 23 (1992), pp. 8–14.
- Introduction to Dental Public Health. FDI World Dental Press, London, 1994. (With M.C. Downer & D.E. Gibbons) ISBN 9780950368757
- Development of Industrial Dental Services in the United Kingdom. Lindsay Society for the History of Dentistry, 1999.
- Development of salaried dental services. A report for the Department of Health. Wellcome Trust Centre for the History of Medicine, London, February 2004.
- "Dentistry and the University of London", Medical History, Vol. 49, No. 4 (1 Oct 2005), pp. 445–462.
- "The Baron Doctor Cornelius Ver Heyden De Lancey (1889–1984): dental surgeon, doctor and lawyer", Journal of Medical Biography, Vol. 14 (2006), No. 1, pp. 54–61.
- "Sydney William Garne LDS RCS FRGS (1875–1946): founding president of the Ceylon Dental Association", Journal of Medical Biography, Vol. 18 (2010), pp. 19–23. DOI: 10.1258/jmb.2009.009092
- "Dental witness seminars: Dentistry in the UK since 1948", British Dental Journal, Vol. 222, No. 3 (February 2016), pp. 133–142. (With N.H.F. Wilson) DOI: 10.1038/sj.bdj.2016.96
- "James Smith Turner (1832–1904) and the British Dental Association", British Dental Journal, Vol. 222, pp. 396–399 (10 March 2017). DOI: 10.1038/sj.bdj.2017.227
- "Nigel Stafford David Allen LDSRCS, Dentist, engineer and racing driver", Dental Historian, Vol. 62 (2017), pp. 57–63.
- From Public Health Dentist to Dental Historian. Stanley Gelbier, London, 2017.
