= The Lindsay Society for the History of Dentistry =

British dental history organisation

- Formation: 1962
- Founders: J E McAuley, Leslie Godden, Archie Donaldson

The Lindsay Society is a British dental history organisation open to anyone interested in the subject, including non-dentists. It has close links with the British Dental Association and is dedicated to the study of the history of dentistry.

== Origins ==
The Lindsay Club was formed in 1962, the idea of dental surgeon J. E. McAuley. He was inspired by the Osler Club, a society for those interested in the history of medicine, of which he was a member. The new club was intended to perform the same function for the history of dentistry and was named after Lilian Lindsay, the first woman to qualify as a dentist in the UK and a president of the British Dental Association. The first meeting of the Lindsay Club was held in October 1962, two years after Lindsay's death. At a later date the club was renamed The Lindsay Society.

== Meetings ==
The Lindsay Society holds meetings in London and an annual meeting each year usually in the home town of the current president. There is an annual Lilian Lindsay memorial lecture each year. The society is affiliated to the British Society for the History of Medicine.

== Dental Historian ==
The society publishes the Dental Historian twice yearly in January and July which contains articles related to the history of dentistry. Issues older than one year are available at the society's web site. https://www.lindsaysociety.co.uk.

== Chairmen and presidents ==
The following persons have been chairmen/president of the society:

- 1962–1966 Ronald A Cohen
- 1967–1968 L. J. Godden
- 1969–1974 J. A. Donaldson
- 1975–1976 J. E. McAulay
- 1977–1978 Ivo Vinski
- 1979–1980 Ronald A. Cohen
- 1981–1983 Stanley Gelbier
- 1984–1986 Muriel Cohen
- 1987–1993 Anne Hargreaves
- 1994–1997 John F. Beal
- 1998–1999 Christine Hillam
- 2000–2002 Henry Noble
- 2003–2004 Stanley Gelbier
- 2005–2006 Geoff Garnett
- 2007–2008 John Craig
- 2009–2010 Robin Basker
- 2011–2012 Stuart Robson
- 2013–2014 Stuart Geddes
- 2015–2016 Rachel Bairsto
- 2017–2018 David McGowan
- 2019–2021 Roland Hopwood
- 2022–2023 Roz McMullan
- 2023–2024 Helen Nield
*2025-2027 Peter Dyer
