= Frank Colyer =

British dental surgeon (1866–1954)

Portrait by Walter Stoneman, 1921

Sir James Frank Colyer KBE FRCS FDSRCS Eng (25 September 1866 – 30 March 1954) was a British dental surgeon and dental historian.

Colyer trained at Charing Cross Hospital and the Royal Dental Hospital. He was awarded the Licentiate in Dental Surgery (LDS) of the Royal College of Surgeons of England in 1887 and two years later also became a qualified physician as Member of the Royal College of Surgeons (MRCS) and Licentiate of the Royal College of Physicians (LRCP). He served as a house officer and demonstrator of operative dentistry at the Royal Dental Hospital, then was appointed full surgeon. He served as dean from 1904 to 1909.

In 1893 he also became dental surgeon to Charing Cross Hospital. During the First World War, he served as consulting dental surgeon to the Croydon War Hospital and the Ministry of Pensions, and for these services he was appointed Knight Commander of the Order of the British Empire (KBE) in January 1920. In 1922, he was elected first president of the British Society of Dental Surgeons, which he had been instrumental in forming to oppose the admission of unqualified dentists to the British Dental Association.

Colyer was also an expert on the history of dentistry. In 1900 he was appointed honorary curator of the odontological museum at the Royal Dental Hospital, which was later moved to the Royal College of Surgeons, and retained the position for the rest of his life.

His publications included the textbook Dental Surgery and Pathology (with Evelyn Sprawson; it reached eight editions within his lifetime), Old Instruments for Extracting Teeth (1952), Dental Surgery and Pathology (1910), Dental Disease and its Relation to General Medicine (1911), John Hunter and Odontology (1913), Chronic General Periodontitis, and Variations and Diseases of the Teeth of Animals (1936; with revised 2nd edition in 1990 and paperback reprint of 1990 edition in 2003).
