= Frederick Newland-Pedley =

British physician and dentist

Frederick Newland-Pedley (1855 – 1944) was a British physician and dentist known for his contribution to the fields of military dentistry and dental education.

== Early life ==
Newland-Pedley was born in 1855. He studied at Dulwich College and Guy's Hospital, becoming first a physician, a member of the Royal College of Surgeons of England in 1881 and a fellow of the same in 1885. In 1880 he received his L.D.S degree from the Royal Dental Hospital in Leicester Square.

== Career ==
At Guy's hospital he was appointed as a dental surgeon in 1887. When the dentist he had been assisting became seriously ill, Newland-Pedley took up his responsibilities and also began the hospital's first dental department at his own expense. In 1888 he proposed the idea of a dental school to the hospital's board; the school opened with twelve chairs the next year in 1889.

From February to June 1900, Newland-Pedley volunteered in the British Army during the Boer War, becoming the army's first appointed field dentist. He brought his own supplies and equipment, setting up in a tent to treat soldier's dental problems. Returning from the war, he proposed to the British Army that a more permanent dental service be instituted. This resulted in four dentists being sent on contract to the Boer war.

During World War I, Newland-Pedley again served as a volunteer dental surgeon, this time at Rouen.

Following the war, he practiced in London as a dentist, ultimately retiring to Italy.

He died at Lake Como, Italy, on 4 May 1944. His headstone can be found along the northern wall of the Santa Maria Assunta church graveyard, located in Santa Maria Rezzonico, on the north west shore of Lake Como, Italy.

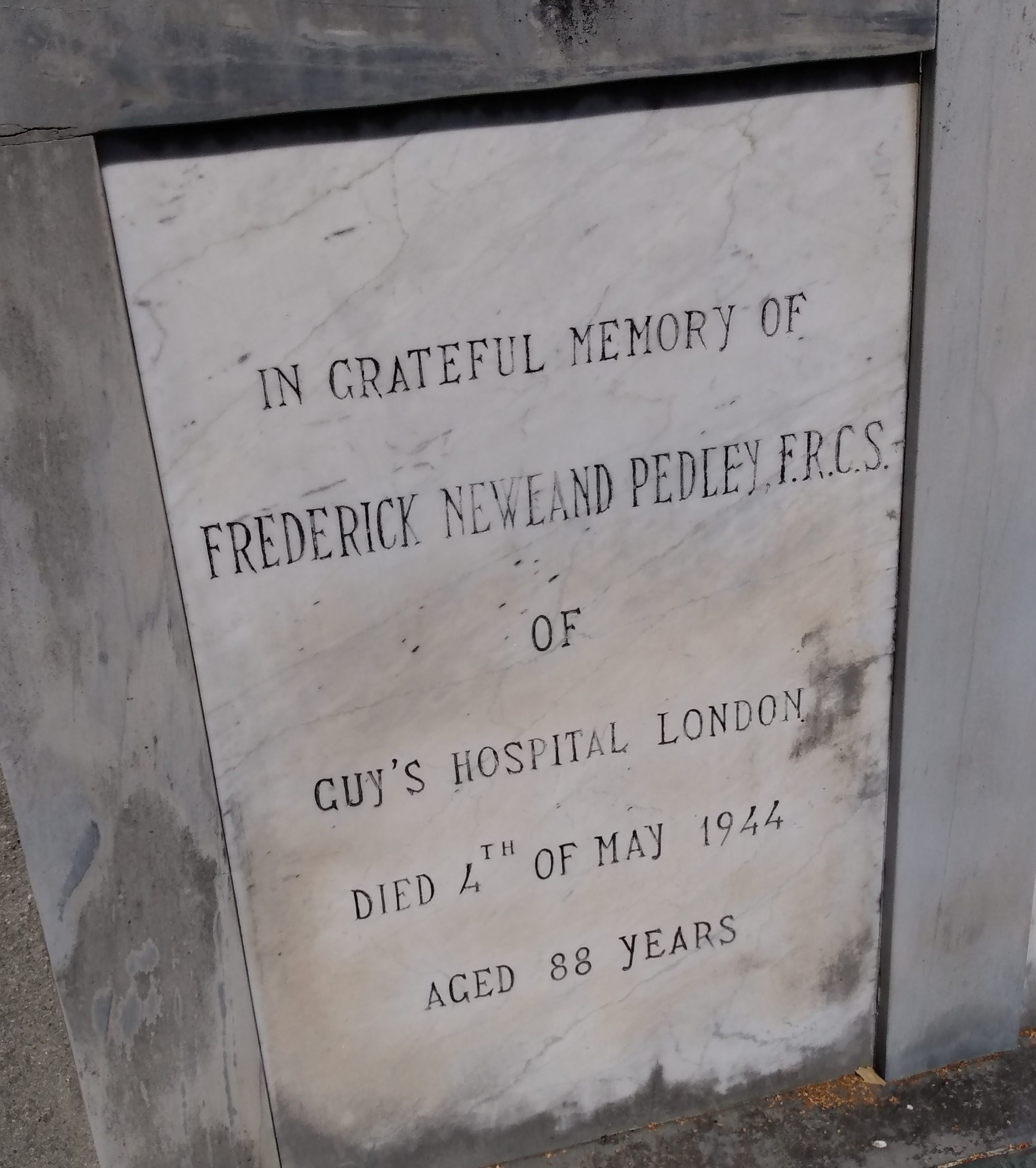
Newland Pedley Headstone
