= Odontological Society of Great Britain =

- Successor: Royal Society of Medicine (Odontological Section)
- Formation: November 10, 1856
- Type: Medical society
- Purpose: Advancement of dentistry and dental education
- Headquarters: London
- Members: Dentists
- Key people: Samuel Cartwright (First President); John Tomes; Edwin Saunders

The Odontological Society of Great Britain was a learned society formed in 1863 by the merger of the Odontological Society of London and the College of Dentists of England, both of which had been founded within a day of each other in 1856. In 1907 it joined the Royal Medical and Chirurgical Society and other specialist medical societies to form the Royal Society of Medicine.
