= Dental Historian =

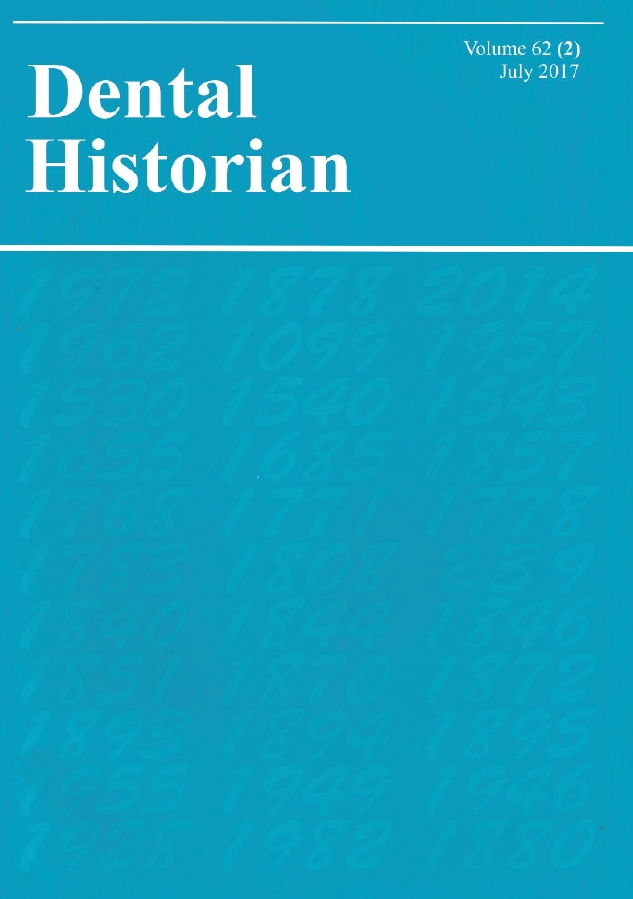
- Discipline: History of dentistry
- Language: English

Publication details
- Former name(s): Occasional Newsletter (Lindsay Club)
- History: 1964–present
- Publisher: The Lindsay Society for the History of Dentistry
- Frequency: Biannual
- Open access: Delayed, 1 year

Standard abbreviations
- ISO 4: Dent. Hist.

Indexing
- ISSN: 0958-6687
- OCLC no.: 13341556

Links
- Journal homepage

Dental Historian is the official journal of The Lindsay Society for the History of Dentistry, published twice a year and free to the society's members. It was originally established as the Occasional Newsletter in the 1970s, acquiring its current name in 1985. The journal is included in the Scopus database.
