= Edwin Saunders =

English dentist

Sir Edwin Saunders (12 March 1814 – 15 March 1901) was Queen Victoria's personal dentist, and the first dental surgeon to be knighted.

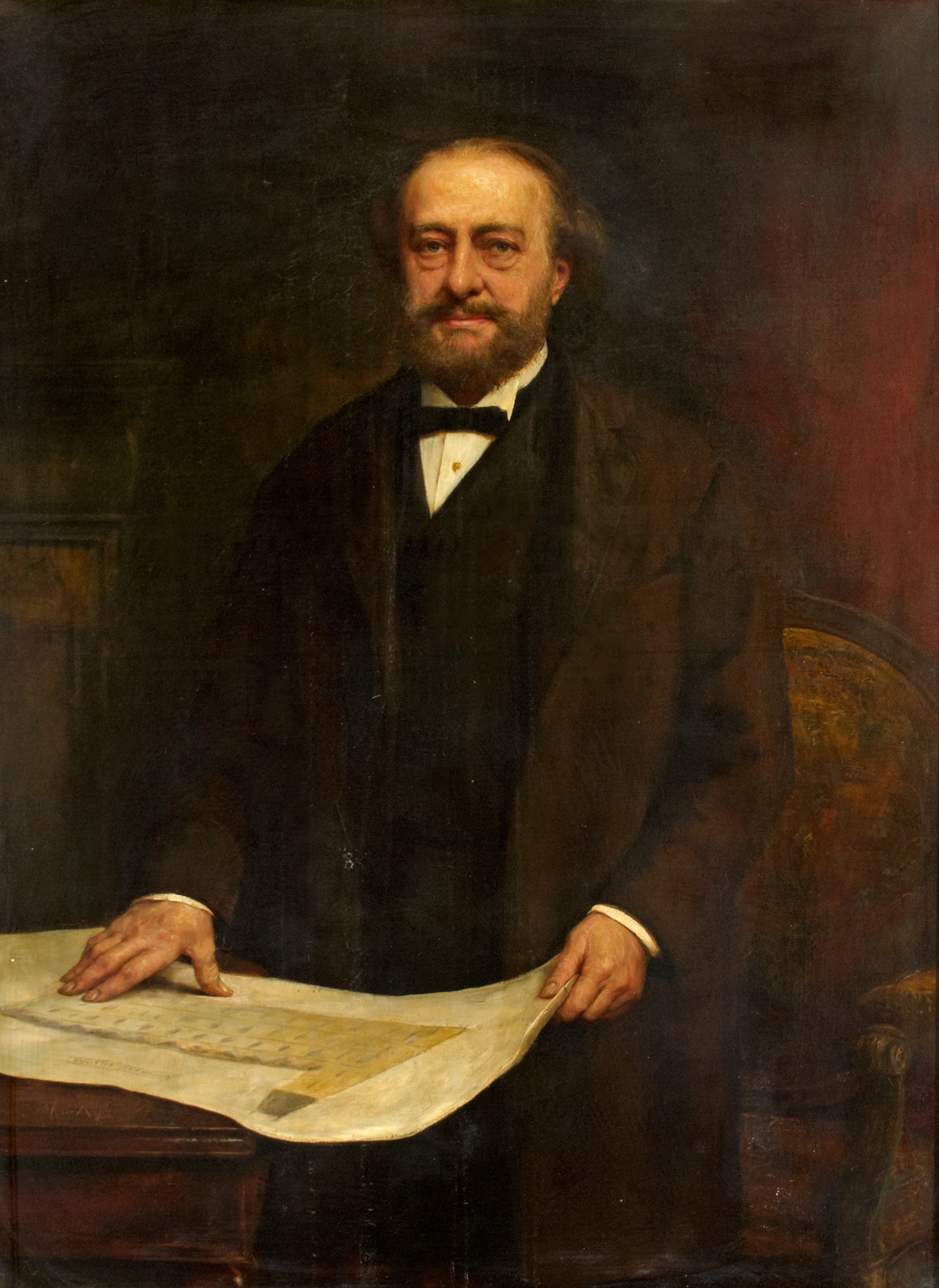
Edwin Saunders, 1884 portrait

== Life ==
Born in London on 12 March 1814, he was son of Simon Saunders, senior partner in the firm of Saunders & Ottley, publishers, in Brook Street, London. He was articled as a pupil to Mr. Lemaile, a dentist in Southwark. At the end of three years he gave a course of lectures on elementary mechanics and anatomy at a mechanics' institute. The surgeon Frederick Tyrrell was present at one lecture, and Saunders was invited to lecture at St. Thomas's Hospital.

With the diploma of the Royal College of Surgeons in 1839, Saunders was appointed dental surgeon and lecturer on dental surgery to St. Thomas's Hospital, a post he occupied until 1854. In 1855 he was elected F.R.C.S. He was also dentist from 1834 to the Blenheim Street Infirmary and Free Dispensary, and in 1840 he started, in conjunction with Mr. Harrison and Mr. Snell, a small institution for the treatment of the teeth of the poor. It was the first charity of its kind, and lasted about twelve years.

Whilst working on cleft palate, Saunders came to know Alexander Nasmyth, who had a large dental practice in London; and after 1846, when Nasmyth was incapacitated by paralysis, Saunders bought Nasmyth's practice, which he carried on at Nasmyth's house, 13a George Street, Hanover Square, until he retired to Wimbledon. He succeeded Nasmyth in 1846 as dentist to Queen Victoria, Albert, Prince Consort, and other members of the royal family.

Saunders was president of the dental section at the meeting of the International Medical Congress which met in London in 1881, and in the same year was president of the metropolitan counties branch of the British Medical Association. In 1883 he was knighted, being the first dentist to receive that honour. In 1886, he was president of the British Dental Association. He died at Fairlawn, Wimbledon Common, on 15 March 1901, and was buried at Putney Vale Cemetery.

== Professionalisation of dentistry ==
Saunders tried to organise the dental profession, and in 1856 he, with others, petitioned the Royal College of Surgeons of England to grant a diploma in dental surgery; but it was not until after many negotiations that the college obtained powers, on 8 September 1859, to examine candidates and grant a diploma in dentistry. The Odontological Society of London was founded at Saunders's house in 1857 to unite those who practised dental surgery. Saunders was the first treasurer, and was president in 1864 and 1879.

Saunders was trustee of the first dental hospital and school established in London, in Soho Square in 1859. The institution prospered, and in 1874 the Dental Hospital in Leicester Square was opened, being handed over to the managing committee, free of debt. Colleagues and friends commemorated the work of Saunders by founding in the school the Saunders scholarship.

== Family ==
In 1848 Saunders married Marian, eldest daughter of Edmund William Burgess, who died in 1906.

== Works ==
Saunders was author of:

- Advice on the Care of the Teeth, 1837.
- The Teeth as a Test of Age considered in reference to the Factory Children. Addressed to the Members of both Houses of Parliament, 1837; it was used by factory inspectors.
