= Lilian Lindsay =

First qualified woman dentist in the UK (1871–1960)

Lilian Lindsay CBE FSA
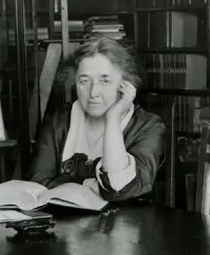
- Lindsay in 1920
- Born: Lilian Murray; 24 July 1871; Holloway, London
- Died: 31 January 1960 (aged 88)
- Education: Camden School for Girls; North London Collegiate School; Edinburgh Dental Hospital and School
- Years active: 1895–1960
- Known for: First qualified UK woman dentist First woman President of the British Dental Association
- Medical career
- Profession: Dentist
- Institutions: British Dental Association
- Sub-specialties: Dental librarian
- Research: History of dentistry

Lilian Lindsay, CBE, FSA (née Murray) (24 July 1871 – 31 January 1960) was a dentist, dental historian, librarian and author who became the first qualified female dentist in Britain and the first female president of the British Dental Association.

== Biography ==
She was born Lilian Murray in Holloway, London in 1871, the daughter of a musician, and the third of eleven children. She was educated at the Camden School for Girls, and won a scholarship to the North London Collegiate School. The founder and headmistress of the school, Frances Buss, informed Lilian that she would be suited to a career teaching deaf children; Lilian disagreed, and informed Miss Buss that she would become a dentist. Due to the argument, Lilian lost the scholarship and left the school in 1889.

Lilian Lindsay on her career choice
"Miss Buss … sent for me and announced that I was destined to be a teacher of the deaf and dumb. Whether the sudden attack roused my rebellious spirit or I may have had an allergy to teaching I do not know, but I refused to teach. This enraged Miss Buss who stated emphatically "Then I will prevent you from doing anything else". Like a flash I replied "You cannot prevent me from being a dentist". She prevented me from having that second scholarship. I knew nothing of dentistry, but having stated boldly that I would be a dentist, there was nothing else to be done."

— Cohen E. Cohen RA. The Autobiography of Dr Lilian Lindsay. Br Dent J 1991 171(10) 325

Lindsay was able to secure a three-year apprenticeship in dentistry through a family friend, but did not feel this was enough and sought to enrol in dental school. She passed preliminary examinations, and in 1892 she applied for entry to the National Dental Hospital in Great Portland Street. The dean, Henry Weiss, refused to admit her because she was a woman; he was so concerned that she would distract the male students that he interviewed her on the pavement outside the school. He also advised her not to apply to the Dental Hospital of London as the Royal College of Surgeons of England did not allow women to sit their examinations at that time. He did suggest that she apply to Edinburgh Dental Hospital and School, and she was accepted there by the dean W. Bowman Macleod. Even then she met with the disapproval of some of the Edinburgh staff; Sir Henry Littlejohn remarked "I am afraid, madam, you are taking the bread out of some poor fellow's mouth."

She met her future husband, Robert Lindsay, a member of the teaching staff, on her first day at the dental school. During her time in Edinburgh she won the Wilson Medal for dental surgery and pathology and the medal for materia medica and therapeutics in 1894. She graduated with LDS (Hons), RCS Ed. in 1895, the first woman to qualify as a dentist in the United Kingdom (others had previously travelled abroad to America amongst other countries to gain a qualification). She subsequently joined the British Dental Association in November 1895, the first woman to become a member.

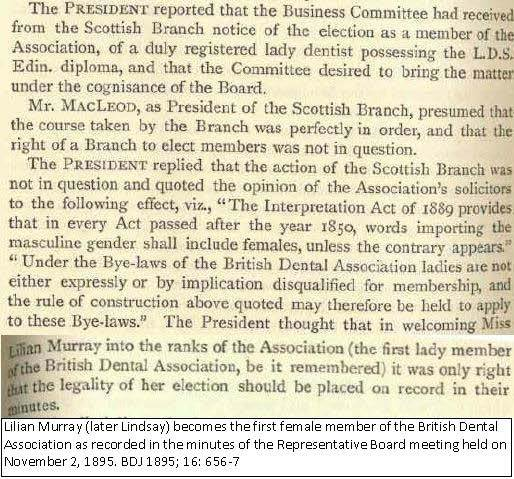
Report of Lilian Murray becoming the first female British Dental Association member as reported at the November 1895 Representative Board meeting

After qualifying, Lilian returned to North London to work until 1905, a move she had to make to pay off her debts. In 1905 she married Robert Lindsay and moved back to Edinburgh to practise with him at 2 Brandon Street. They continued in practice until 1920, when Robert was appointed the first full-time Dental Secretary of the British Dental Association. They moved to a flat above the BDA headquarters in Russell Square, London, and Lilian became honorary librarian to the BDA. She founded the library with books bequeathed by Gaddes, and contributed her own artefacts to start the museum. She learned French, German, Latin and some Old English and Spanish to help with her historical research.

Robert Lindsay died in November 1930. Following this she became sub-editor of the British Dental Journal (BDJ) in 1931, a post she held for 20 years. She remained on the BDJ editorial committee until her death, and published 57 papers in the BDJ between 1925 and 1959. In 1933 she published her book on the history of dentistry (A Short History of Dentistry). In the same year she delivered the first C.E. Wallis lecture to the Royal Society of Medicine, and later became President of the Odontological Section (1945) and History of Medicine Society (previously section), (1950–2) of the RSM. She was also President of the British Society for the Study of Orthodontics (B.S.S.O.) in 1938.

In 1946, Lindsay became the first female President of the British Dental Association, was awarded an honorary doctorate by the University of Edinburgh, and was awarded the CBE. She also published her translation of Pierre Fauchard's Le Chirurgien Dentiste (The Surgeon Dentist) in 1946, the first time the landmark work had been translated into English. She continued to expand the BDA library until her death in 1960, and received a number of awards and honorary degrees during this time.

== Awards and honours ==
- 1894 – Wilson Medal for dental surgery and pathology and the medal for materia medica and therapeutics, Edinburgh Dental Hospital and School
- 1895 – Licentiate in Dental Surgery, Edinburgh Dental Hospital and School
- 1938 – President of the British Society for the Study of Orthodontics
- 1945 – John Tomes Prize, Royal College of Surgeons of England; President of the Odontological Section of the Royal Society of Medicine
- 1946 – President, British Dental Association; honorary LL.D., University of Edinburgh; Commander of the Order of the British Empire (CBE)
- 1947 – Fellowship of Dental Surgery (FDS), Royal College of Surgeons of England
- 1950 – First female President of the Medical Society of London
- 1950 - 1952 - First female President of the History of Medicine Society at the Royal Society of Medicine.
- 1959 – Colyer Gold Medal, Royal College of Surgeons of England; Fellowship of Dental Surgery, Royal College of Surgeons of Edinburgh
- Master of Dental Surgery (MDS), University of Durham
- Fellowship of the Society of Antiquaries
- Honorary Member of the Odonto-Chirurgical Society of Scotland
- Vice-president of the Johnson Society
- Honorary Member of the Edinburgh Women Students
- Honorary Member of the American Academy of the History of Dentistry

== Legacy ==
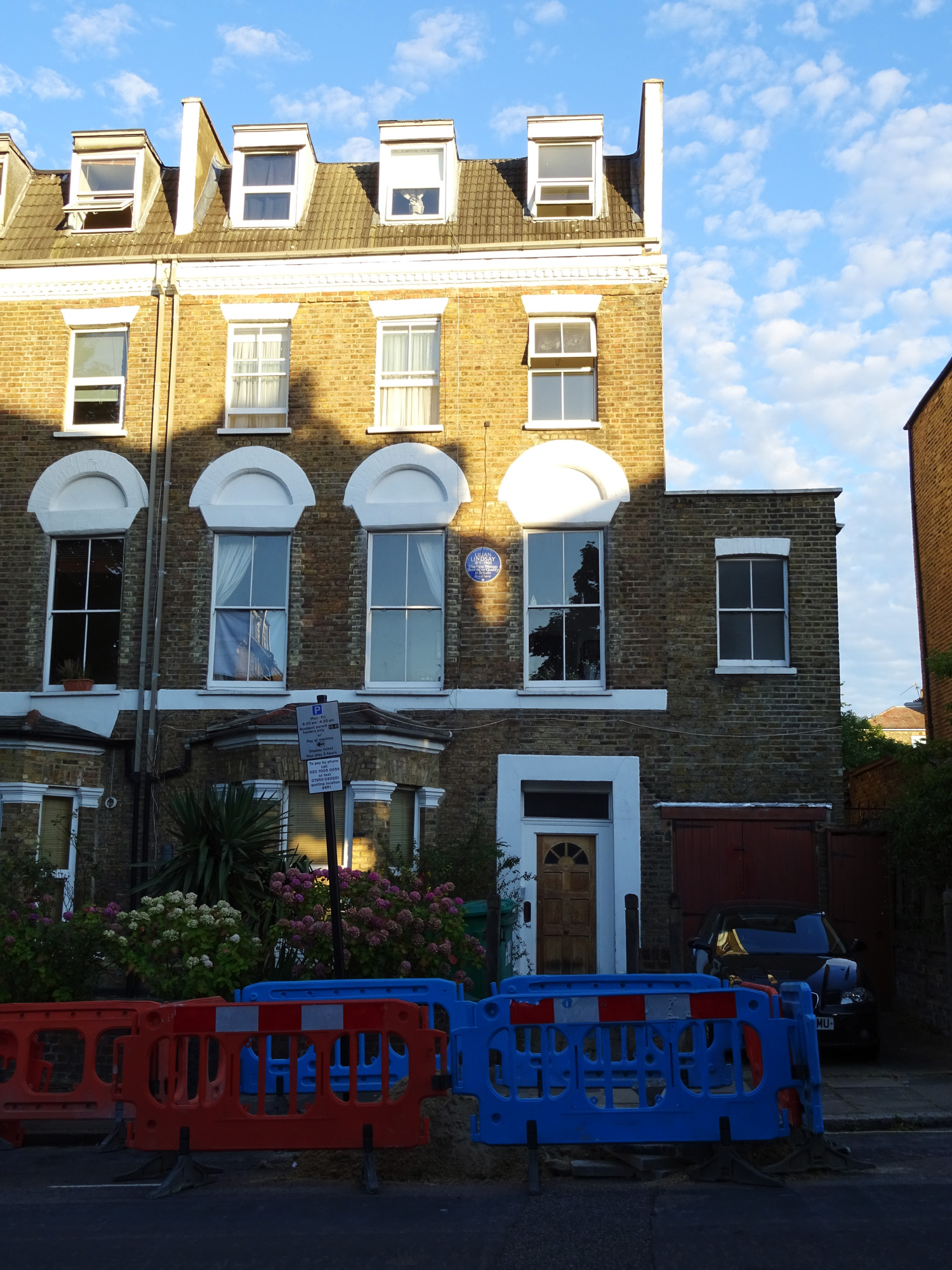
LILIAN LINDSAY - 3 Hungerford Road Holloway London N7 9LA

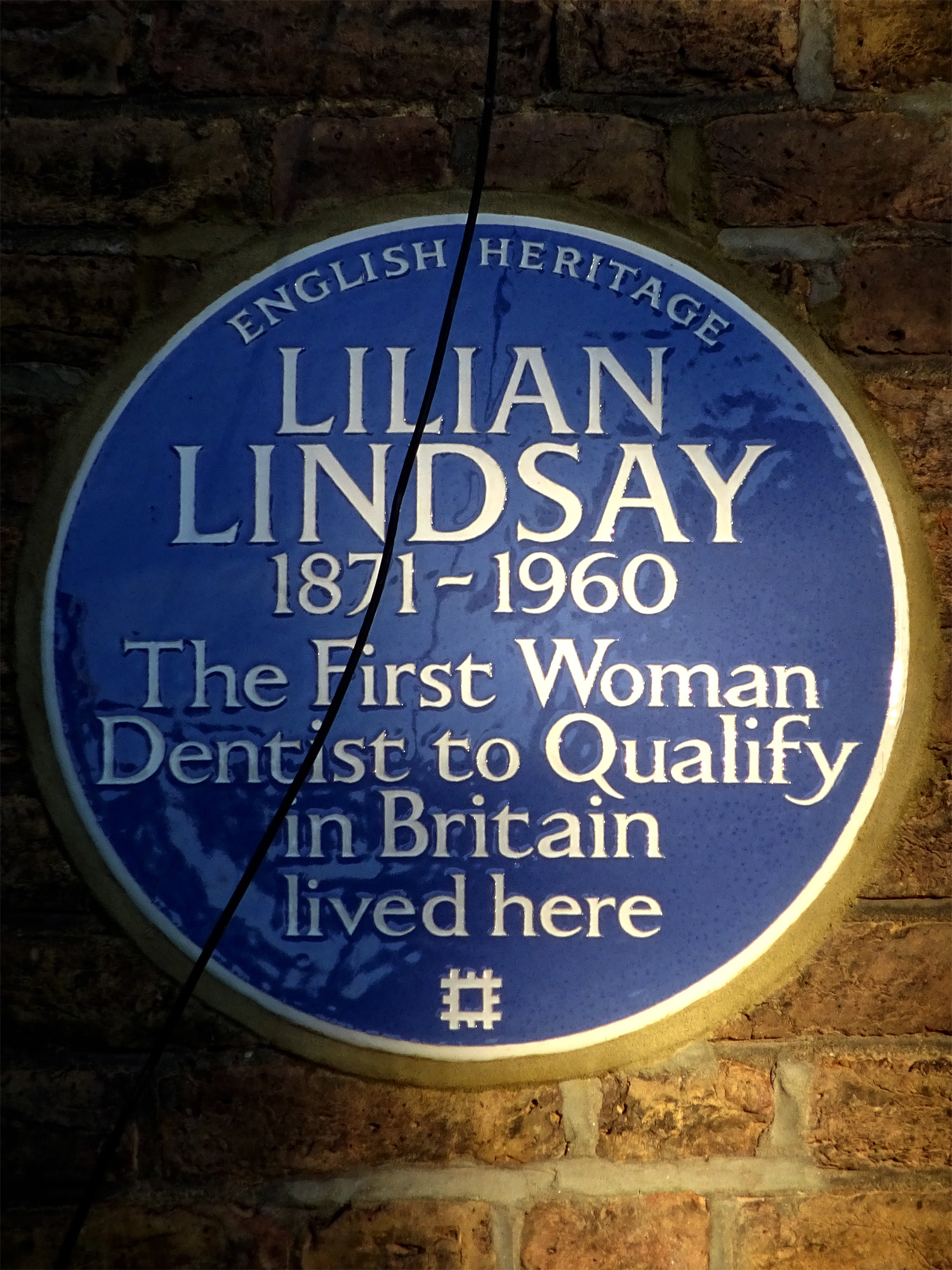
LILIAN LINDSAY 1871-1960 The First Woman Dentist to Qualify in Britain lived here- blue plaque

By the time of her death, the BDA library was considered one of the best dental libraries in the world; it is still named the Robert and Lilian Lindsay Library. In 1962 the Lindsay Society for the History of Dentistry was formed and named after Lilian Lindsay.

An English Heritage blue plaque commemorating Lindsay was placed at 3 Hungerford Road, Holloway, London, where Lindsay had lived for the first twenty years of her life, in 2013. It was at this address that Lindsay first decided to become a dentist. The plaque was unveiled by Dame Margaret Seward, the former President of the General Dental Council and Chief Dental Officer and Lindsay's niece, Margaret Murray.

In 2023 The New York Times published a belated obituary for Lilian Lindsay as part of its Overlooked series.
