= Neil Swallow =

- Born: James Neil Swallow; 1931; Taunton, England
- Died: 29 April 2010 (aged 78–79)
- Occupation: Dentist
- Relatives: Barbara (wife)

James Neil Swallow (1931 – 29 April 2010) was a pioneering British dentist who developed treatments for adults and children with mental and physical disabilities. He co-authored a standard textbook on children's dentistry. In 1964, Swallow became senior lecturer in children's dentistry at the Cardiff Dental School. This was followed in 1975 by his appointment as professor of paediatric dentistry at the University of Amsterdam, and then as professor of restorative dentistry at Belfast Dental School in 1978.

== Early life ==
Swallow was born in Taunton, England, in 1931. He obtained his Bachelor of Dental Surgery degree from the London Hospital in 1955.

== Career ==
Swallow founded clinics for children with disabilities at Dr Barnardo's Home and the London Hospital, during a period in which there was little interest in the oral health of disabled people. He frequently made night calls to construct feeding plates for new-born children with cleft palates.

Along with Geoffrey Slack and Phil Holloway, he authored Child Dental Health (1969) which for many years was a standard textbook on children's dentistry and well-remembered by dental students from his time. In addition, in the late 1950s and early 1960s, he would visit the Bobaths at their centre in London for children with cerebral palsy. In 1964, Swallow was awarded the A.A.E. Newth Prize by the Society of Medical Officers of Health.

He moved to Cardiff in 1964, where he had been appointed as the first senior lecturer in children's dentistry at the then new Cardiff Dental School. He set up a course in paediatric dentistry and developed a dental service for children and adults with a disability. His MD thesis on the oral health of people with disability was published in 1967. Swallow carried on treating children and adults with disabilities when he became professor of paediatric dentistry at the University of Amsterdam in 1975. In 1978, he was appointed professor of restorative dentistry at the Belfast Dental School, where he remained until 1983. When he returned from Belfast, he started a dental practice at home with his second wife Barbara.

== Death and legacy ==
Swallow died on 29 April 2010. He received obituaries in the Journal of Disability and Oral Health and the British Dental Journal. His wife, Barbara, later talked about his work in a witness seminar.

== Selected publications ==
- P.J. Holloway, J.N. Swallow, and G.L. Slack. Child Dental Health: A Practical Introduction. John Wright, Bristol, 1969. ISBN 0723602166.
- J.N. Swallow. Out of the Mouth..... Queen's University of Belfast, 1979. ISBN 0853891540.
