= Bertram Cohen (dentist) =

Bertram "Bert" Cohen (1918-2014) was the first Nuffield Research Professor of Dental Science at the Royal College of Surgeons.

== Selected publications ==
- Cohen, Bertram; Kramer, Ivor Robert Horton (1976). Scientific Foundations of Dentistry. Heinemann Medical. ISBN 978-0-433-06185-4.
- Cohen, Bertram; Mason, David K.; Poswillo, David E. (1978). Oral Medicine and Diagnosis. Heinemann Medical Books. ISBN 978-0-433-06193-9.
