= Tomas Albrektsson =

Swedish physician

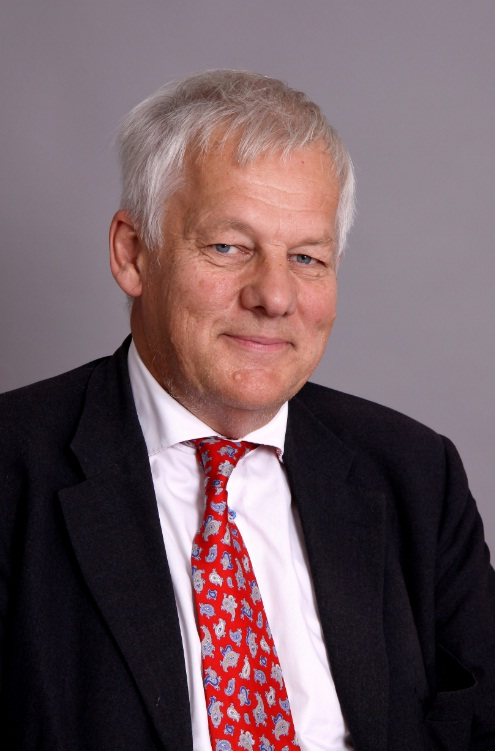
Tomas Albrektsson

Tomas Albrektsson (born August 25, 1945) is a Swedish physician who trained under Per-Ingvar Brånemark, the "father of modern dental implantology". and is noteworthy for having contributed significantly to the field of implant dentistry.

== Education ==
Albrektsson received his medical degree in 1973 and his doctorate in 1979, publishing his thesis on the healing of bone graft, having worked under Brånemark.

== Selected publications ==
- Albrektsson T, Zarb G, Worthington P, Eriksson AR. The long-term efficacy of currently used dental implants: a review and proposed criteria of success. Int J Oral Maxillofac Imp 1986;1(1):11-25.
- Albrektsson T, Zarb G. Current interpretations of the osseointegrated response: clinical significance. Int J Prostho 1993;6(2):95-105.
- Albrektsson T, Isidor F. Consensus report of Session IV. In Lang NP, Karring T, editors: Proceedings of the 1st European Workshop on Periodontology. London: Quintessence, 1993. pages 365–369
- Chrcanovic B, Albrektsson T. Sixty Years of Clinical Experience with Nobel Biocare Osseointegrated Implants. 1st ed. Berlin: Quintessence. 2025. 284 p.
