= British Society of Oral Health and Disability =

British dental care association

British Society of Oral Health and Disability logo and mission

The British Society for Special Care Dentistry, formerly known as the British Society for Disability and Oral Health (until 2022) and the British Society of Dentistry for the Handicapped, is an association devoted to bringing together those interested in the oral care of people with disabilities. The society holds two scientific meetings each year. The winter meeting is held in London in December; the spring meeting is held at various locations throughout the UK. Meeting programmes cover a wide range of topics, behavioural and social as well as clinical. BSDH has group membership of the International Association for Disability and Oral Health (IADH), meaning that BSDH members automatically join IADH.

== Society objectives ==
- To promote the oral health of disabled people of all ages.
- To promote links with organisations representing disabled people
- To consult with disability groups to identify their needs and demands
- To study the barriers relating to the provision of oral health care for disabled people
- To develop Undergraduate and Postgraduate teaching in the subject
- To encourage research in the field of oral health for disabled people

== Selected publications ==
- The use of general anaesthesia in special care dentistry: A clinical guideline for the British Society for Disability and Oral Health (2022)
- Undergraduate curriculum in Special Care Dentistry (2014)
- The Oral Management of Oncology Patients Requiring Radiotherapy, Chemotherapy and or Bone Marrow Transplantation updated 2018
- Clinical Guidelines & Integrated Care Pathways for the Oral Health Care of People with Learning Disabilities updated 2012
- Clinical Holding Guidelines, 2010
- Guidelines for the Delivery of a Domiciliary Oral Healthcare Service, revised 2009
