= History of dental treatments =

The history of dental treatments dates back to thousands of years. The scope of this article is limited to the pre-1981 history.

The earliest known examples of dental caries manipulation are found in a Paleolithic man at least 49,000 years ago and another dated between 14,160 and 13,820 BP. The earliest known use of a filling after removal of decayed or infected pulp is found in a Paleolithic who lived near modern-day Tuscany, Italy, from 13,000 to 12,740 BP. Although inconclusive, researchers have suggested that rudimentary dental procedures have been performed as far back as 130,000 years ago by Neanderthals.

Two dentists are considered to have changed the history of dental treatments:

Ambroise Paré (c. 1510 – 1590) was a French barber surgeon who served in that role for Kings of France Henry II, Francis II, Charles IX and Henry III. He is considered one of the fathers of surgery and modern forensic pathology and a pioneer in surgical techniques and battlefield medicine, especially in the treatment of wounds.

Pierre Fauchard (1679 – 1761) is credited as being the "father of modern dentistry". He is widely known for writing the first complete scientific description of dentistry, Le Chirurgien Dentiste ("The Surgeon Dentist"), published in 1728. The book described basic oral anatomy and function, signs and symptoms of oral pathology, operative methods for removing decay and restoring teeth, periodontal disease (pyorrhea), orthodontics, replacement of missing teeth, and tooth transplantation.

Regarding implants, one of the milestone progress is osseointegration which was termed in 1981 by Tomas Albrektsson.

== Dental implants ==
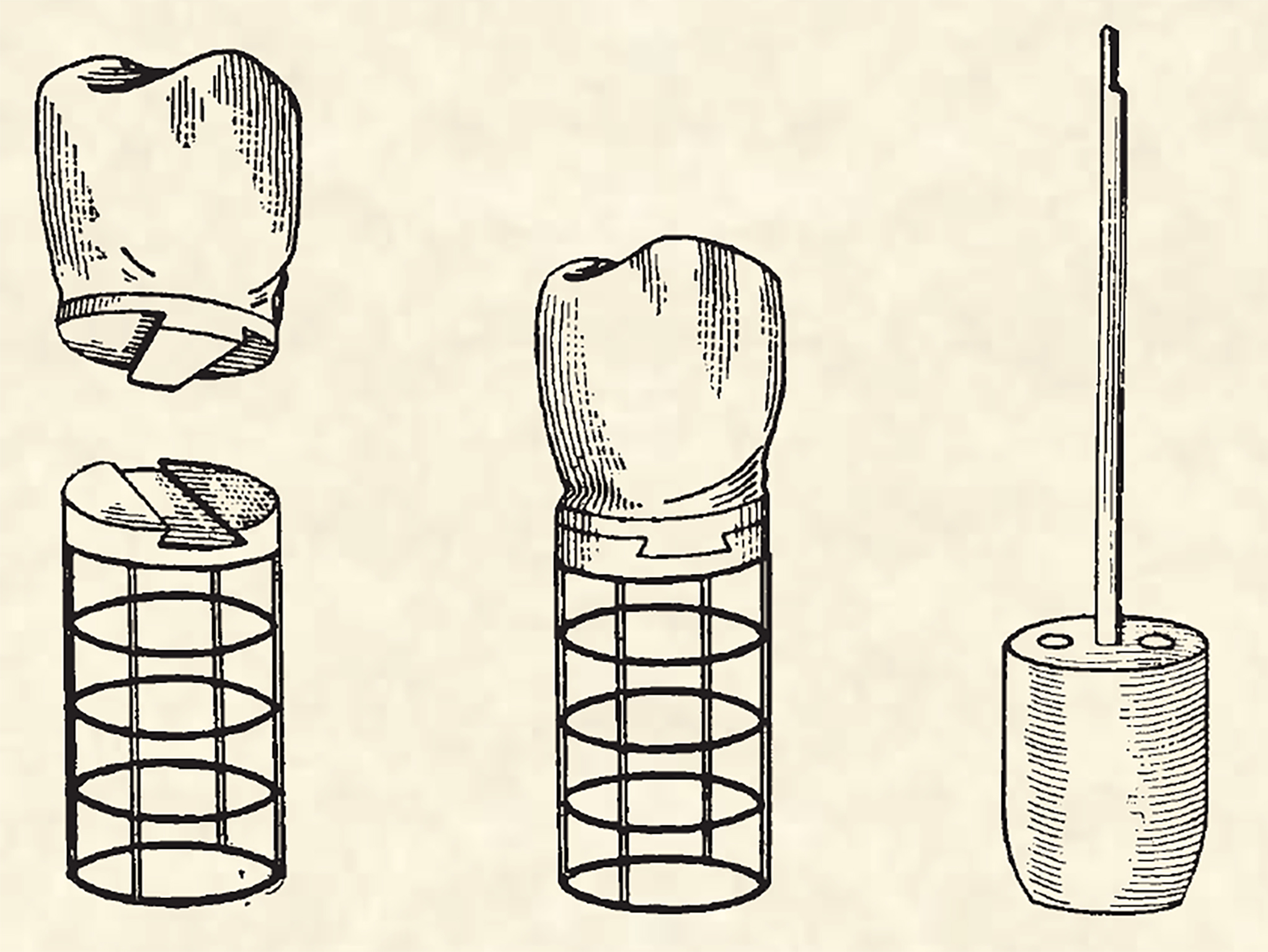
Greenfield's basket: one of the earliest examples of a successful endosseous implant was Greenfield's 1913 implant system

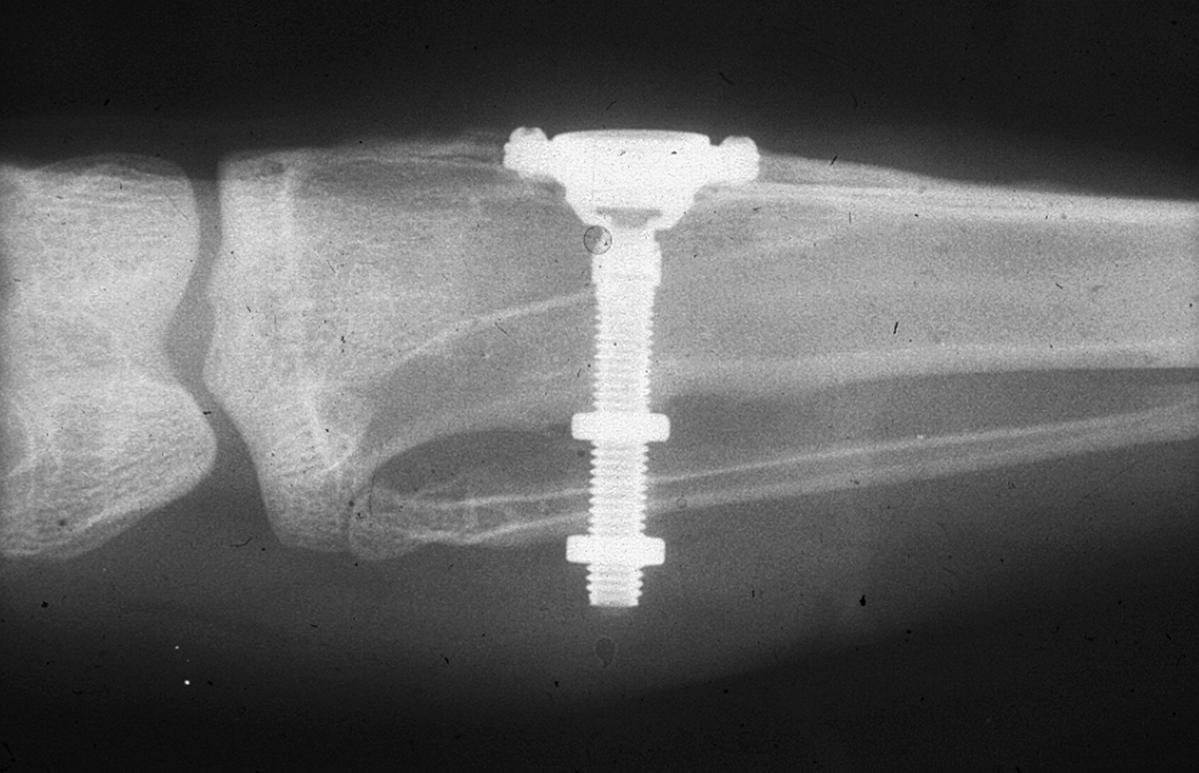
While studying bone cells in a rabbit tibia using a titanium chamber, Brånemark was unable to remove it from bone. His realization that bone would adhere to titanium led to the concept of osseointegration and the development of modern dental implants. The original x-ray film of the chamber embedded in the rabbit tibia is shown (made available by Brånemark).

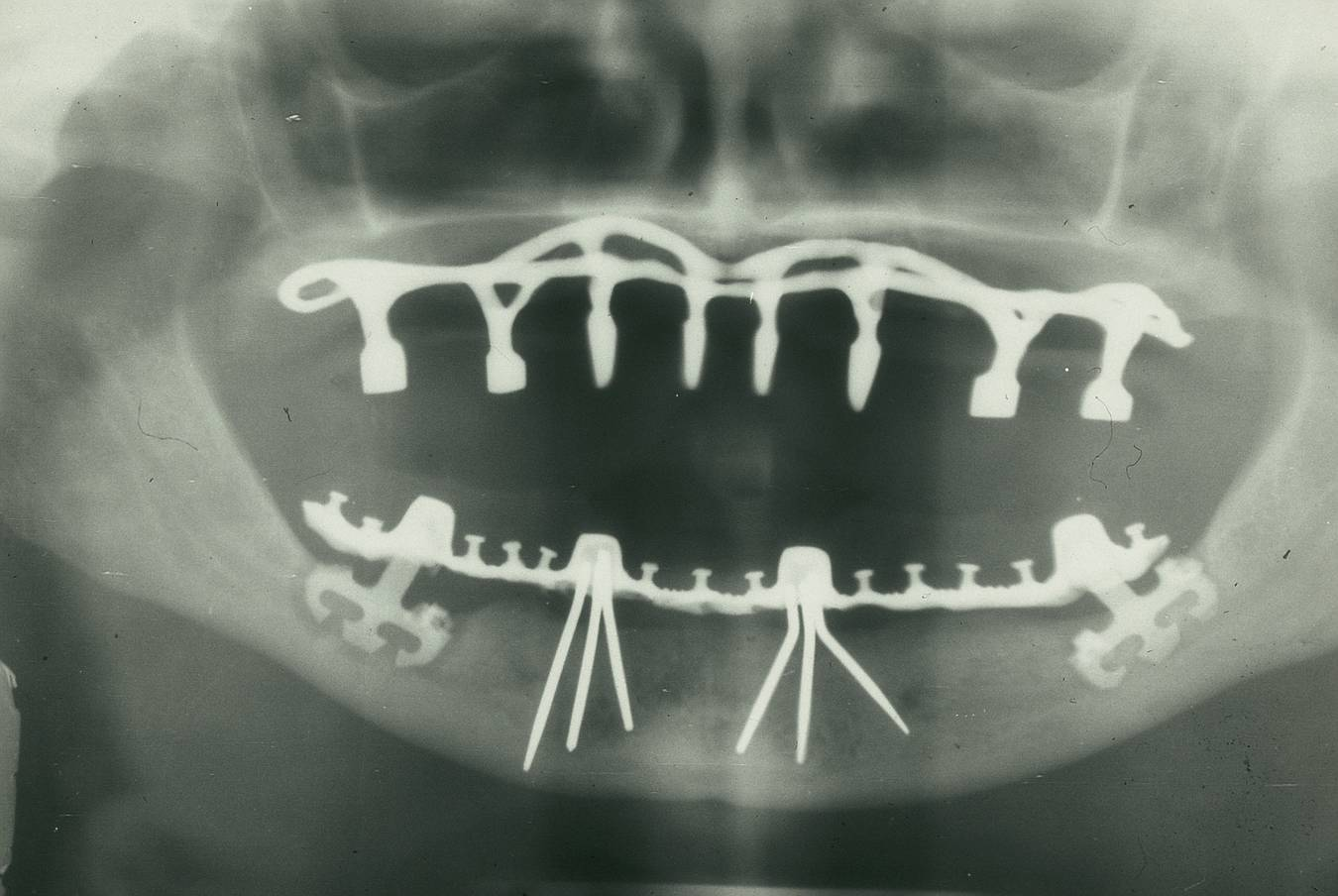
Panoramic radiograph of historic dental implants, taken 1978

There is archeological evidence that humans have attempted to replace missing teeth with root form implants for thousands of years. Remains from ancient China (dating 4000 years ago) have carved bamboo pegs, tapped into the bone, to replace lost teeth, and 2000-year-old remains from ancient Egypt have similarly shaped pegs made of precious metals. Some Egyptian mummies were found to have transplanted human teeth, and in other instances, teeth made of ivory. Etruscans produced the first pontics using single gold bands as early as 630 BC and perhaps earlier. Wilson Popenoe and his wife in 1931, at a site in Honduras dating back to 600 AD, found the lower mandible of a young Mayan woman, with three missing incisors replaced by pieces of sea shells, shaped to resemble teeth. Bone growth around two of the implants, and the formation of calculus, indicates that they were functional as well as esthetic. The fragment is currently part of the Osteological Collection of the Peabody Museum of Archaeology and Ethnology at Harvard University.

In modern times, a tooth replica implant was reported as early as 1969, but the polymethacrylate tooth analogue was encapsulated by soft tissue rather than osseointegrated.

The early part of the 20th century saw a number of implants made of a variety of materials. One of the earliest successful implants was the Greenfield implant system of 1913 (also known as the Greenfield crib or basket). Greenfield's implant, an iridioplatinum implant attached to a gold crown, showed evidence of osseointegration and lasted for a number of years. The first use of titanium as an implantable material was by Bothe, Beaton and Davenport in 1940, who observed how close the bone grew to titanium screws, and the difficulty they had in extracting them. Bothe et al. were the first researchers to describe what would later be called osseointegration (a name that would later be marketed by Per-Ingvar Brånemark). In 1951, Gottlieb Leventhal implanted titanium rods in rabbits. Leventhal's positive results led him to believe that titanium represented the ideal metal for surgery.

In the 1950s research was being conducted at Cambridge University in England on blood flow in living organisms. These workers devised a method of constructing a chamber of titanium which was then embedded into the soft tissue of the ears of rabbits. In 1952 the Swedish orthopaedic surgeon, Per-Ingvar Brånemark, was interested in studying bone healing and regeneration. During his research time at Lund University he adopted the Cambridge-designed "rabbit ear chamber" for use in the rabbit femur. Following the study, he attempted to retrieve these expensive chambers from the rabbits and found that he was unable to remove them. Brånemark observed that bone had grown into such close proximity with the titanium that it effectively adhered to the metal. Brånemark carried out further studies into this phenomenon, using both animal and human subjects, which all confirmed this unique property of titanium. Leonard Linkow, in the 1950s, was one of the first to insert titanium and other metal implants into the bones of the jaw. Artificial teeth were then attached to these pieces of metal. In 1965 Brånemark placed his first titanium dental implant into a human volunteer. He began working in the mouth as it was more accessible for continued observations and there was a high rate of missing teeth in the general population offered more subjects for widespread study. He termed the clinically observed adherence of bone with titanium as "osseointegration". Since then implants have evolved into three basic types:

1. Root form implants; the most common type of implant indicated for all uses. Within the root form type of implant, there are roughly 18 variants, all made of titanium but with different shapes and surface textures. There is limited evidence showing that implants with relatively smooth surfaces are less prone to peri-implantitis than implants with rougher surfaces and no evidence showing that any particular type of dental implant has superior long-term success.
2. Zygoma implant; a long implant that can anchor to the cheek bone by passing through the maxillary sinus to retain a complete upper denture when bone is absent. While zygomatic implants offer a novel approach to severe bone loss in the upper jaw, they have not been shown to offer any advantage over bone grafting functionally, although they may offer a less invasive option, depending on the size of the reconstruction required.
3. Small-diameter implants are implants of low diameter with one-piece construction (implant and abutment) that are sometimes used for denture retention or orthodontic anchorage.

Ceramic implants made from alumina were introduced between 1960s and 1970s but were eventually withdrawn from the market in the early 1990s because they presented some biomechanical problems (like low fracture toughness) and were replaced by zirconia implants.

Robot-assisted dental surgery, including for dental implants, has also been developed in the 2000s.

== Dentures ==
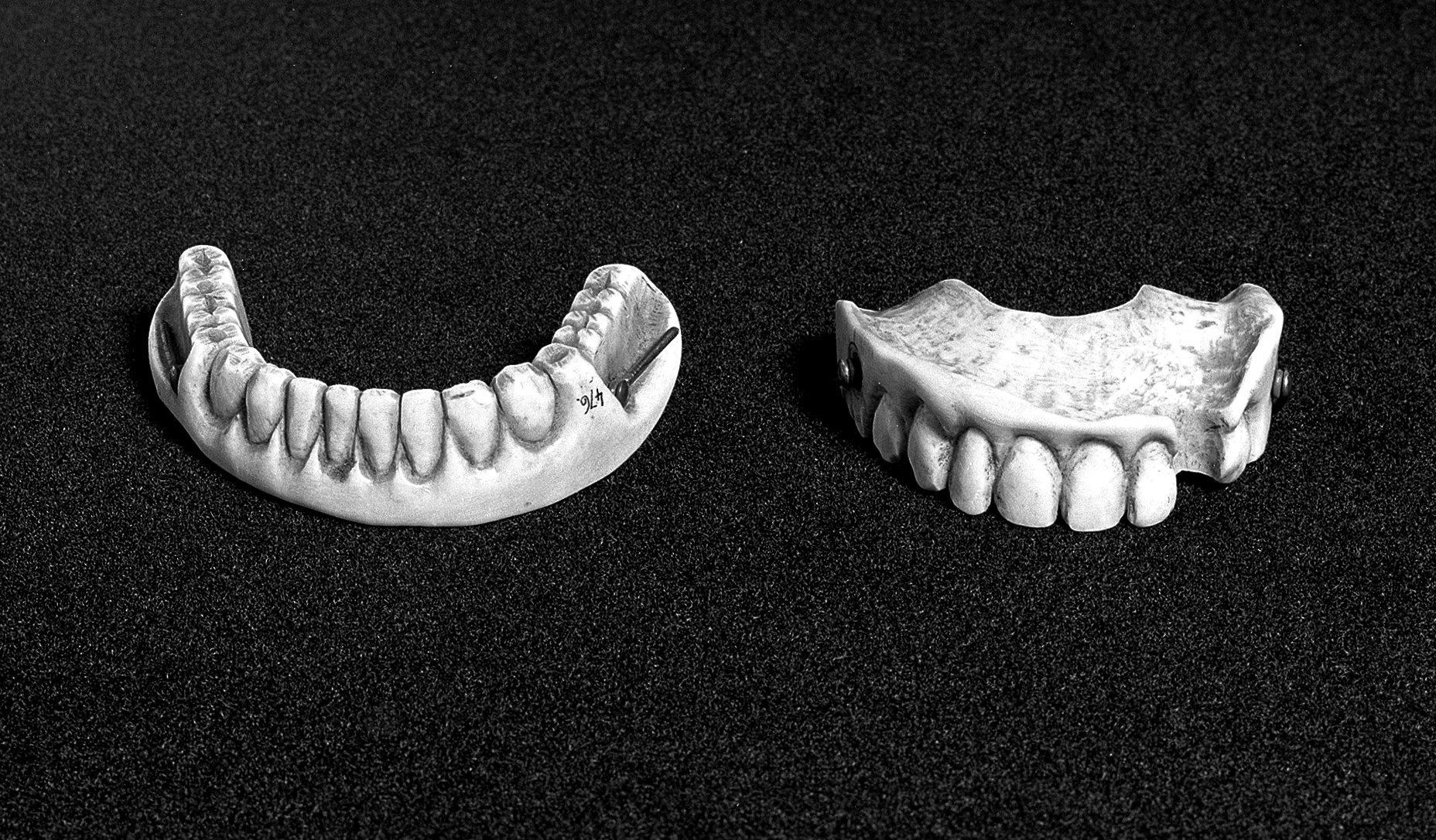
Carved ivory dentures from the 18th century. Left is lower/mandibular; upper/maxillary is at right.

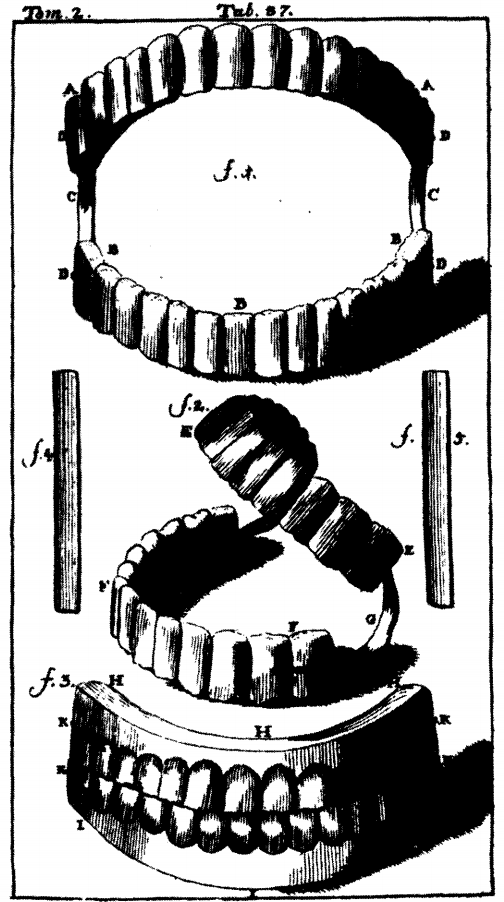
Pierre Fauchard described the construction of dentures using a metal frame, animal bone teeth, and leaf springs in 1728.

As early as the 7th century BC, Etruscans in northern Italy made partial dentures out of human or other animal teeth fastened together with gold bands. The Romans had likely borrowed this technique by the 5th century BC.

Wooden full dentures were invented in Japan around the early 16th century. Softened beeswax was inserted into the patient's mouth to create an impression, which was then filled with harder beeswax. Wooden dentures were then meticulously carved based on that model. The earliest of these dentures were entirely wooden, but later versions used natural human teeth or sculpted pagodite, ivory, or animal horn for the teeth. These dentures were built with a broad base, exploiting the principles of adhesion to stay in place. This was an advanced technique for the era; it would not be replicated in the West until the late 18th century. Wooden dentures continued to be used in Japan until the Opening of Japan to the West in the 19th century.

In 1579 gold and silver dentures were created by the barber-dentist Ambroise Paré for the French King Charles IX. Ambroise Paré is considered one of the fathers of surgery and modern forensic pathology and a pioneer in surgical techniques and battlefield medicine, especially in the treatment of wounds. In 1728, Pierre Fauchard described the construction of dentures using a metal frame and teeth sculpted from animal bone. The first porcelain dentures were made around 1770 by Alexis Duchâteau. In 1791, the first British patent was granted to Nicholas Dubois De Chemant, previous assistant to Duchateau, for 'De Chemant's Specification':

[...] a composition for the purpose of making of artificial teeth either single double or in rows or in complete sets, and also springs for fastening or affixing the same in a more easy and effectual manner than any hitherto discovered which said teeth may be made of any shade or colour, which they will retain for any length of time and will consequently more perfectly resemble the natural teeth.

He began selling his wares in 1792, with most of his porcelain paste supplied by Wedgwood.

17th century London's Peter de la Roche is believed to be one of the first 'operators for the teeth', men who advertised themselves as specialists in dental work. They were often professional goldsmiths, ivory turners or students of barber-surgeons.

In 1820, Samuel Stockton, a goldsmith by trade, began manufacturing high-quality porcelain dentures mounted on 18-carat gold plates. Later dentures from the 1850s on were made of Vulcanite, a form of hardened rubber into which porcelain teeth were set. In the 20th century, acrylic resin and other plastics were used. In Britain, sequential Adult Dental Health Surveys revealed that in 1968 79% of those aged 65–74 had no natural teeth; by 1998, this proportion had fallen to 36%.

George Washington (1732–1799) had problems with his teeth throughout his life, and historians have tracked his experiences in great detail. He lost his first adult tooth when he was twenty-two and had only one left by the time he became president. John Adams says he lost them because he used them to crack Brazil nuts but modern historians suggest mercury oxide, which he was given to treat illnesses such as smallpox and malaria, probably contributed to the loss. He had several sets of false teeth made, four of them by a dentist named John Greenwood. None of the sets, contrary to popular belief, were made from wood or contained any wood. The set made when he became president were carved from hippopotamus and elephant ivory, held together with gold springs. Prior to these, he had a set made with real human teeth, likely ones he purchased from "several unnamed Negroes, presumably Mount Vernon slaves" in 1784. Washington's dental problems left him in constant pain, for which he took laudanum. This distress may be apparent in many of the portraits painted while he was still in office, including the one still used on the $1 bill. (Note: The Smithsonian Institution states in "The Portrait—George Washington: A National Treasure" that: Stuart admired the sculpture of Washington by French artist Jean-Antoine Houdon, probably because it was based on a life mask and therefore extremely accurate. Stuart explained, "When I painted him, he had just had a set of false teeth inserted, which accounts for the constrained expression so noticeable about the mouth and lower part of the face. Houdon's bust does not suffer from this defect. I wanted him as he looked at that time." Stuart preferred the Athenaeum pose and, except for the gaze, used the same pose for the Lansdowne painting.)

Charles Darwin (1809–1882) had dental problems from an early age, resulting from the repeated vomiting that was a feature of his life-long illness and the seasickness he suffered when aboard HMS Beagle. Like patients today with repeated vomiting, the regurgitation of gastric acid would have caused tooth erosions. When the Beagle was in Hobart (1836) he visited a local dental practitioner, Henry Jeanneret (1802–1886) and earlier in the voyage (1833) he recorded that he needed a denture to be repaired. Later in life (1852) he had five 'grinders' (molars) removed under chloroform, and his is one of the first records of this substance being used as an anaesthetic in dentistry.

== Advancements in 3D printing and applications in dentistry ==
3D printing

There have been significant advances in the field of dentistry within the past 50 years due to the use and development of 3D printing and imaging. These innovations include stereolithography and digital light processing.

Stereolithography

The stereolithography (SLA) technique was developed by Charles Hull and patented in 1986. The technology was originally developed for manufacturing use, and has been applied to a multitude of fields. Common applications for this technology in dentistry include but are not limited to modeling, temporary prosthetics, retainers, aligners, and orthodontic models.

An ultraviolet (UV) laser is used to cure a liquid polymer resin into layers. This liquid polymer is then held in a container as the laser polymerizes the layers of resin. This process is repeated layer by layer, and the finished product is refined and hardened in an UV oven or a solvent bath.

Digital light processing

Digital light processing (DLP) was created shortly after SLA technology in 1987, at Texas Instruments. The SLA and DLP methods are very similar, but the DLP method has a couple key process characteristics that differ. Applications of this technology include custom dental molds and models, as well as custom-fit medical equipment.

DLP utilizes 3D printing machines that accept computer-aided design (CAD) files and .STL files. The process starts with the build platform being lowered into a vat of liquid resin. A digital light source is then used to harden each layer. The light source cures the resin, and the layers build on top of each other until they are eventually removed from the printer. The resin that is typically used is thermosetting resin, which is cured when exposed to a light source. DLP printers are efficient in that each coordinate in a layer is cured simultaneously.

Dental applications of 3D printing technology

Toothbuds that resemble real teeth have been 3D printed. Other applications include dental modeling, digital orthodontics, medical modeling, drilling and cutting guides, and partial denture frameworks.
