= United Medical and Dental Schools of Guy's and St Thomas' Hospitals =

Former medical school in London, England

- Type: Medical school
- Active: 1982–1998
- Location: London, England

The United Medical and Dental Schools of Guy's and St Thomas' Hospitals (UMDS) was a joint medical and dental school in London, formed from the merger of Guy's Hospital Medical School, St Thomas's Hospital Medical School, and the Royal Dental Hospital of London.

UMDS first came into existence in 1982 with the merger of the medical schools of Guy's and St. Thomas' Hospitals. It was enlarged in 1983 when the Royal Dental Hospital of London School of Dental Surgery merged with Guy's Hospital Dental School, and again in 1985 with the addition of the Postgraduate Institute of Dermatology.

Students of UMDS were initially allocated to one of two campuses, with most preclinical teaching and all clinical teaching being separate. With the intake of 1989, students ceased being allocated in this way, and teaching for all students was divided between the campuses and their peripheral hospitals.

Discussions between King's College London and UMDS regarding a further merger began in 1992. UMDS was subsequently absorbed into King's College London on 1 August 1998, and was initially called the GKT School of Medicine; in 2005 this in turn became the King's College London School of Medicine and Dentistry. Subsequently, the dental school became the Dental Institute and the remainder was renamed the King's College London School of Medicine. In 2015 the naming decision was partially reversed and the medical school is currently named King's College London GKT School of Medical Education.

== History ==
Guy's and St. Thomas' Hospitals were associated with each other before the creation of UMDS. Prior to 1769, the two hospitals were known as the United Hospitals. This arrangement was formalised in 1769, after which students of physicians were taught at Guy's Hospital while students of surgeons were taught at St. Thomas' Hospital.

A dispute between the two hospitals regarding the successor to Sir Astley Cooper resulted in Guy's Hospital establishing its own medical school in 1825. After this, students of surgeons attended operations at both hospitals until 1836. A riot between students of the two hospitals broke out in the operating theatre at St. Thomas's in 1836 which ended the arrangement, and the medical schools remained separate until the formation of UMDS in 1982.
