= British Dental Association =

Professional body for dentists in the United Kingdom

- British Dental Association
- Founded: 1880; 146 years ago
- Headquarters: Wimpole Street, London, W1G 8YS
- Location: United Kingdom
- Members: ▼15,698
- Chair: Eddie Crouch
- Key people: John Tomes (founder)
- Publication: British Dental Journal
- Website: bda.org

The British Dental Association (BDA) is a registered trade union for dentists in the United Kingdom.

Its stated mission is to "promote the interests of members, advance the science, arts and ethics of dentistry and improve the nation's oral health."

== Structure ==
The majority of the BDA's 16,000 members include high street dentists, working in general practice providing both National Health Service (NHS) and private care, and those working in community and hospital settings, universities and the British armed forces.

The BDA's headquarters is in Wimpole Street, London near Queen's College, London in the City of Westminster and it currently has offices in Stirling, Scotland, Belfast, Northern Ireland and Cardiff, Wales.

== History ==
In 1856 two dental societies were founded in Britain: the Odontological Society of London and the College of Dentists of England. The two societies merged in 1863 to form the Odontological Society of Great Britain and joined the Royal Society of Medicine as its Odontological Section in 1907.

By the 1870s leading dentists including Sir John Tomes and Sir Edwin Saunders (one of Queen Victoria's dentists) formed the Dental Reform Committee, to help bring unity, organisation and code of ethics to the dental profession. This committee campaigned successfully for the first legislation to regulate dentistry, the Dentists Act 1878 (41 & 42 Vict. c. 33), which limited the title of "dentist" and "dental surgeon" to registered practitioners. Qualified practitioners and those who could show they had practised dentistry for five years prior to 1878 were the only ones eligible to register.

The Dental Reform Committee called for a nationwide meeting to establish the BDA in 1879 and established it in 1880. The BDA elected Sir John Tomes as its first President. Much of the BDA's early work involved prosecuting dentists in breach of the Dentists Act 1878.

One active member of the BDA was Charles Edward Wallis, being on the association's representative board for six years. He also wrote extensively for the BDJ.

The Dentists Act 1921 (11 & 12 Geo. 5. c. 21) created the Dental Board of the UK to administer the Dentists Register. Thus the BDA was freed from legislation, and rapidly emerged as the leading consultative body and voice for the dental profession.

The 1921 act introduced a provision that only registered individuals could practise dentistry. However, unqualified practitioners were given opportunity to register if they could show they had been practising dentistry for five years prior to 1921. The last unqualified dentist ceased practise during the 1970s.

In 1946 Lilian Lindsay became the first female president of the BDA.

== British Dental Association Museum ==
Its museum in Wimpole Street holds the largest collection of dental material in Britain. It includes dental instruments, equipment, furniture, photographs, archives, fine and decorative art. The museum is maintained as a national resource for the dental profession, dental industry, researchers and members of the public and aims to promote an appreciation of dentistry today through an understanding of its past. The museum is a member of the London Museums of Health & Medicine.

The museum also offers an enquiry and research service for individuals wanting to learn more about the history of dentistry or whether their ancestors were dentists. On several occasions the museum has also been used as a professional consultant on television series such as Call the Midwife.

== British Dental Association Library ==
The Robert and Lillian Lindsay Library was opened in 1920. It was founded and organised by Lillian Lindsay, the first woman to qualify as a dentist in the UK. The library is the most comprehensive dental library in Europe, and subscribes to over 200 dental journals and provides members with free Medline searches.

The Library is located at BDA Headquarters.

It releases peer-reviewed journals published by Nature Research, BDJ Team and British Dental Journal. The latter was established in 1872 as the Monthly Review of Dental Surgery and renamed Journal of the British Dental Association in 1881, before obtaining its current title in 1904. It absorbed the Mouth Mirror and Dental Gazette (1950) and later the Dental Magazine (1970). The journal is a member of the Committee on Publication Ethics. According to the Journal Citation Reports, the journal had a 2020 impact factor of 1.626. Stephen Hancocks is the editor-in-chief for BDJ Team. The journal replaced Vital, which was published between 2003 and 2013. Each issue includes one hour of verifiable continuing professional development (CPD) on topics recommended by the General Dental Council.

== In popular culture ==
Arthur Lemming, special investigator for the BDA, is featured in a 1969 Monty Python's Flying Circus sketch.
