= Royal Dental Hospital =

Former dental hospital in Leicester Square, London

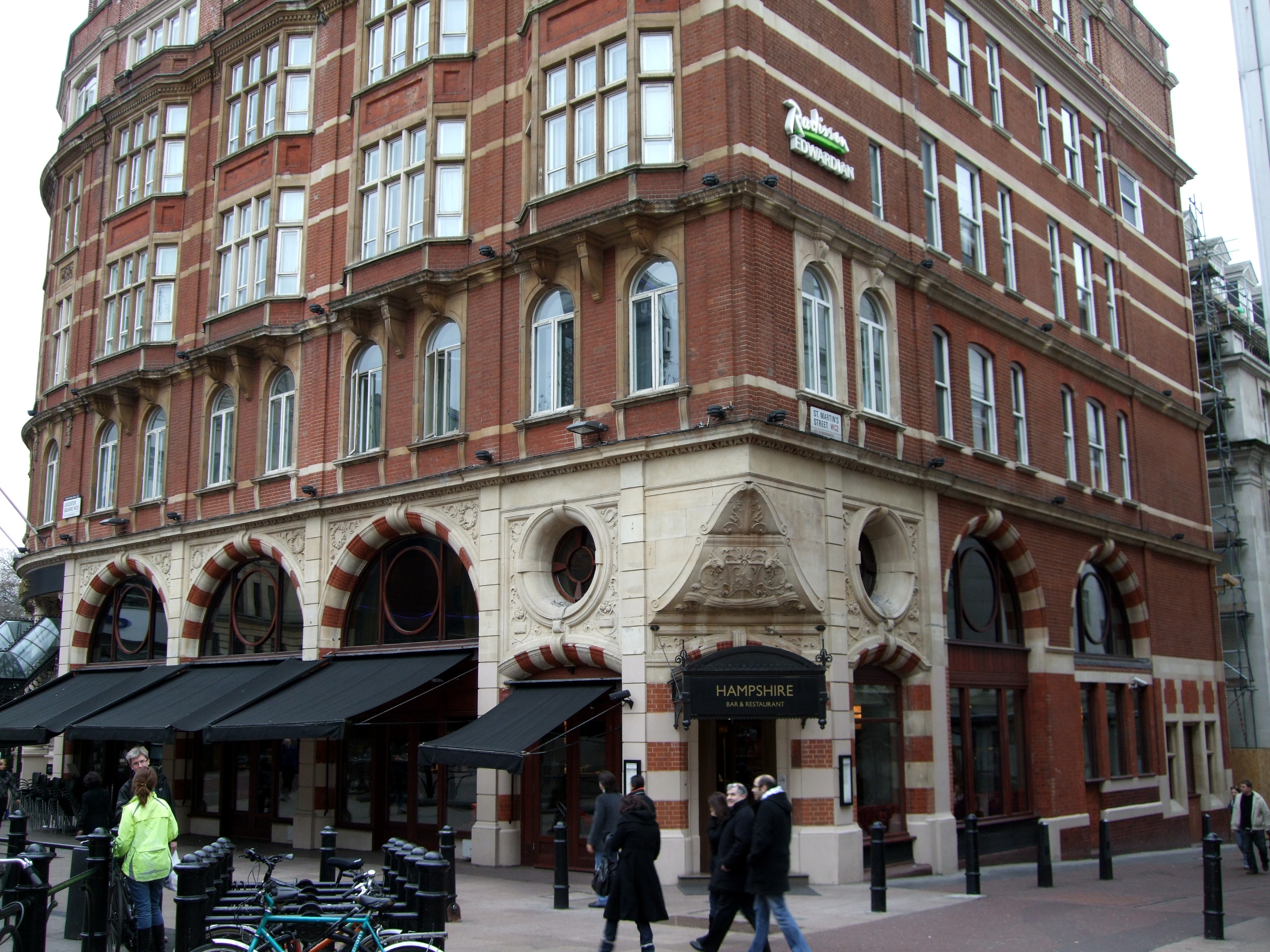
- The former Royal Dental Hospital at 31–36 Leicester Square, now the Hampshire Hotel

Geography
- Location: 31–36 Leicester Square, London, England
- Coordinates: 51°30′35″N 0°07′47″W

Organisation
- Type: Specialist

Services
- Speciality: Dentistry

History
- Opened: 1858
- Closed: 1985

Links
- Lists: Hospitals in England

The Royal Dental Hospital was a dental hospital in Leicester Square, London, which operated from 1858 until 1985. In 1859, it opened the London School of Dental Surgery, later renamed to the Royal Dental Hospital of London School of Dental Surgery, which was the first dental school in Britain.

After the hospital closed in 1985, the building was redeveloped as the Hampshire Hotel. It is now part of the Radisson Blu Edwardian Hotels chain and is known as the Radisson Blu Edwardian Hampshire Hotel.

== History ==
The hospital was opened on 1 December 1858 as the Dental Hospital of London by the Odontological Society of London. The Odontological Society of London, founded in 1856, was one of the two main dental societies in mid nineteenth-century Britain and supported inclusion of dentistry in surgery. The rival College of Dentists of England, founded in the same year, supported a separate dental profession. In 1857 the Odontological Society petitioned Parliament to allow the Royal College of Surgeons of England to conduct dental examinations and a clause was included in the Medical Act 1858 to allow this by granting a new charter to the college. The Royal College of Surgeons was given a new charter in 1859 and introduced a dental qualification, the Licentiate in Dental Surgery in 1860. The College of Dentists founded their National Dental Hospital in Tottenham Court Road in 1861. The two societies merged in 1863 to form the Odontological Society of Great Britain and joined the Royal Society of Medicine as its Odontological Section in 1907.

The hospital was initially based at 22 Soho Square. It opened the first dental school in Britain, the London School of Dental Surgery, on 1 October 1859. Four days later, the College of Dentists founded their own Metropolitan School of Dental Science. In 1874 the hospital moved to 40–41 Leicester Square and in 1901 to a newly built larger building designed by the architects Young and Hall at 31–36 Leicester Square. In the same year, King Edward VII awarded the title of Royal Dental Hospital. The cost of the new building was funded by loans which were not repaid until 1930. The dental school was recognised as a school of the University of London in 1911. At first the school only admitted men, but it agreed to admit women in 1915. The decision was reversed between 1933 and 1939. In 1948 the hospital became part of the St George's Hospital Group under the National Health Act.

In the mid-1980s the dental services transferred to St George's Hospital, Tooting, and the dental school was merged with the United Medical and Dental Schools of Guy's and St Thomas' Hospitals. The hospital closed in 1985 and the building was redeveloped as the Hampshire Hotel. In 2022, the City of Westminster Council decided to put up a plaque at the hotel to commemorate the hospital and medical school.

== See also ==
- University Dental Hospital of Manchester
