= Sand (disambiguation) =

Sand is a naturally occurring, finely divided rock.

Sand may also refer to:

== Arts and entertainment ==
=== Fictional characters ===
- Sand, alias of DC Comics character Sandy Hawkins
- Elia Sand, in Game of Thrones

=== Films ===
- Sand (1949 film), an American western
- Sand (2000 film), an American drama
- The Sand, a 2015 horror film

=== Literature ===
- Sand (novel), a 2011 novel by Wolfgang Herrndorf
- Sand, a 2013 science-fiction novel by Hugh Howey
- Sand: a journey through science and imagination (UK) or Sand: The Never-Ending Story (US), a 2009 book by geologist Michael Welland

=== Music ===
- Sand (band), British post-punk band
- Sand (album), 1987 album by Allan Holdsworth
- "Sand" (Lee Hazlewood song), 1966 song written by Lee Hazlewood
- "Sand" (Dove Cameron song), 2023 song
- "Sand", a 1997 song from the album Whirlygig by The Lovemongers
- "Sand", a 1998 song from the album 28 Days by 28 Days
- "Sand" (Saba song), a Danish song for Eurovision Song Contest 2024

=== Television ===
- "Sand" (Charlie Jade), an episode of the television series Charlie Jade
- "Sand", an episode of the television series Blake's 7

== Places ==
=== Norway ===
- Sand Municipality, the historic name (1837–1886) for the old Bjarkøy Municipality
- Sand, Akershus, a village in Ullensaker municipality in Akershus county
- Sand, Innlandet, a village in Nord-Odal municipality in Innlandet county
- Sand Municipality, a former municipality in Rogaland county
- Sand, Rogaland, a village in Suldal municipality in Rogaland county

=== Switzerland ===
- Sand, Chur, a village in Chur municipality in the canton of Grisons
- Sand, Meiringen, a village in Meiringen municipality in the canton of Bern

=== United Kingdom ===
- Sand, Applecross, a place on the Applecross Peninsula in Wester Ross, Scotland
- Sand, Shetland Islands, a parish in the West Mainland of Shetland in Scotland
- Sand, Somerset, a hamlet in Wedmore parish

=== Elsewhere ===
- Sand, Bas-Rhin, France, a commune in the Bas-Rhin department
- Sand am Main, a municipality in Bavaria, Germany
- Sand, Hungary, a village
- Sand, Iran (disambiguation)
- Sand Creek (disambiguation), including a list of streams in the United States
- Sand Mountain (disambiguation), including several mountains in the United States

=== Multiple countries ===
- Sand Hill (disambiguation)
- Sand Island (disambiguation)
- Sand Lake (disambiguation)
- Sand Point (disambiguation)
- Sand River (disambiguation)

== Other uses ==
- Sand (color), a shade that resembles the color of beach sand
- Sand (surname)
- Sand One (born 1994), American street artist, entrepreneur
- Rheum, also called "sand" or "sleep", the deposit found in the eye after sleep
- SAnD, an abbreviation of social anxiety disorder, to differentiate it from seasonal affective disorder
- SAND protein, a membrane protein

== See also ==
- S And, a variable star
- Sand City, California, United States, a city
- Sande (disambiguation)
