= List of MeSH codes (D26) =

The following is a partial list of the "D" codes for Medical Subject Headings (MeSH), as defined by the United States National Library of Medicine (NLM).

This list continues the information at List of MeSH codes (D25). Codes following these are found at List of MeSH codes (D27). For other MeSH codes, see List of MeSH codes.

The source for this content is the MeSH Browser from the NLM.

== MeSH D26 – pharmaceutical preparations ==
=== MeSH D26.255 – dosage forms ===
==== MeSH D26.255.165 – colloids ====
- MeSH D26.255.165.055 – aerosols
- MeSH D26.255.165.055.055 – aerosol propellants
- MeSH D26.255.165.055.173 – e-cigarette vapor
- MeSH D26.255.165.055.291 – nasal sprays
- MeSH D26.255.165.055.527 – oral sprays
- MeSH D26.255.165.260 – emulsions
- MeSH D26.255.165.260.270 – fat emulsions, intravenous
- MeSH D26.255.165.320 – gels
- MeSH D26.255.165.320.375 – hydrogels
- MeSH D26.255.165.320.375.187 – cryogels
- MeSH D26.255.165.320.375.375 – hydrogel, polyethylene glycol dimethacrylate
- MeSH D26.255.165.320.531 – microgels
- MeSH D26.255.165.320.687 – silica gel
- MeSH D26.255.165.810 – suspensions

==== MeSH D26.255.210 – delayed-action preparations ====
- MeSH D26.255.210.315 – drug implants
- MeSH D26.255.210.860 – tablets, enteric-coated

==== MeSH D26.255.260 – drug carriers ====
- MeSH D26.255.260.259 – elastin-like polypeptides
- MeSH D26.255.260.517 – liposomes
- MeSH D26.255.260.575 – nanocapsules
- MeSH D26.255.260.600 – nanoconjugates
- MeSH D26.255.260.750 – nanoparticle drug delivery system
- MeSH D26.255.260.750.500 – nanovaccines
- MeSH D26.255.260.825 – phytosomes
- MeSH D26.255.260.900 – virosomes

==== MeSH D26.255.830 – tablets ====
- MeSH D26.255.830.860 – tablets, enteric-coated

=== MeSH D26.650 – pharmaceutic aids ===
==== MeSH D26.650.064 – adjuvants, pharmaceutic ====
- MeSH D26.650.064.500 – adjuvants, vaccine
- MeSH D26.650.064.750 – bioenhancers

==== MeSH D26.650.700 – pharmaceutical vehicles ====
- MeSH D26.650.700.419 – excipients

=== MeSH D26.776 – solutions ===
==== MeSH D26.776.314 – hypertonic solutions ====
- MeSH D26.776.314.420 – glucose solution, hypertonic
- MeSH D26.776.314.890 – saline solution, hypertonic

==== MeSH D26.776.498 – isotonic solutions ====
- MeSH D26.776.498.500 – crystalloid solutions
- MeSH D26.776.498.500.500 – ringer's lactate
- MeSH D26.776.498.500.750 – saline solution
- MeSH D26.776.498.750 – ringer's solution

==== MeSH D26.776.708 – pharmaceutical solutions ====
- MeSH D26.776.708.160 – cardioplegic solutions
- MeSH D26.776.708.322 – dialysis solutions
- MeSH D26.776.708.322.651 – hemodialysis solutions
- MeSH D26.776.708.645 – ophthalmic solutions
- MeSH D26.776.708.645.500 – lubricant eye drops
- MeSH D26.776.708.733 – parenteral nutrition solutions
- MeSH D26.776.708.733.500 – fat emulsions, intravenous
- MeSH D26.776.708.822 – sclerosing solutions

=== MeSH D26.969 – xenobiotics ===
The list continues at List of MeSH codes (D27).
