= Transition nuclear protein =

Proteins that are involved in the packaging of sperm nuclear DNA during spermiogenesis

Transition nuclear proteins (TNPs) are proteins that are involved in the packaging of sperm nuclear DNA during spermiogenesis. They take the place of histones associated with the sperm DNA, and are subsequently themselves replaced by protamines.

TNPs in humans include TNP1 and TNP2.

== See also ==
- Chromatin
- Histone
- Protamine
- Sperm
- Spermatogenesis
- Spermiogenesis
