= List of MeSH codes (D25) =

The following is a partial list of the "D" codes for Medical Subject Headings (MeSH), as defined by the United States National Library of Medicine (NLM).

This list continues the information at List of MeSH codes (D23). Codes following these are found at List of MeSH codes (D26). For other MeSH codes, see List of MeSH codes.

The source for this content is the MeSH Browser from the NLM.

== MeSH D25 – biomedical and dental materials ==
=== MeSH D25.058 – alloys ===
- MeSH D25.058.224 – chromium alloys
- MeSH D25.058.224.735 – vitallium
- MeSH D25.058.451 – gold alloys
- MeSH D25.058.520 – metal ceramic alloys
- MeSH D25.058.520.250 – cermet cements
- MeSH D25.058.664 – shape memory alloys
- MeSH D25.058.807 – steel
- MeSH D25.058.807.681 – stainless steel

=== MeSH D25.130 – biocompatible materials ===
- MeSH D25.130.325 – bone substitutes
- MeSH D25.130.420 – coated materials, biocompatible
- MeSH D25.130.535 – decellularized extracellular matrix
- MeSH D25.130.650 – polydioxanone

=== MeSH D25.223 – cariostatic agents ===
- MeSH D25.223.015 – acidulated phosphate fluoride
- MeSH D25.223.432 – fluorides, topical
- MeSH D25.223.716 – sodium fluoride
- MeSH D25.223.800 – tin fluorides

=== MeSH D25.339 – dental materials ===
- MeSH D25.339.208 – dental alloys
- MeSH D25.339.208.224 – chromium alloys
- MeSH D25.339.208.224.959 – vitallium
- MeSH D25.339.208.291 – dental amalgam
- MeSH D25.339.208.534 – gold alloys
- MeSH D25.339.208.720 – metal ceramic alloys
- MeSH D25.339.208.720.250 – cermet cements
- MeSH D25.339.250 – dental casting investment
- MeSH D25.339.291 – dental cements
- MeSH D25.339.291.150 – compomers
- MeSH D25.339.291.300 – dentin-bonding agents
- MeSH D25.339.291.300.500 – silorane resins
- MeSH D25.339.291.402 – glass ionomer cements
- MeSH D25.339.291.402.120 – cermet cements
- MeSH D25.339.291.551 – organically modified ceramics
- MeSH D25.339.291.700 – polycarboxylate cement
- MeSH D25.339.291.750 – resin cements
- MeSH D25.339.291.800 – silicate cement
- MeSH D25.339.291.925 – zinc oxide-eugenol cement
- MeSH D25.339.291.950 – zinc phosphate cement
- MeSH D25.339.312 – dental implants
- MeSH D25.339.334 – dental impression materials
- MeSH D25.339.334.574 – inlay casting wax
- MeSH D25.339.376 – dental porcelain
- MeSH D25.339.574 – photoinitiators, dental
- MeSH D25.339.773 – pit and fissure sealants
- MeSH D25.339.788 – pulp capping and pulpectomy agents
- MeSH D25.339.816 – resins, synthetic
- MeSH D25.339.816.500 – composite resins
- MeSH D25.339.859 – root canal filling materials
- MeSH D25.339.859.495 – gutta-percha

=== MeSH D25.376 – dentifrices ===
- MeSH D25.376.262 – denture cleansers
- MeSH D25.376.711 – toothpastes

=== MeSH D25.479 – membranes, artificial ===
- MeSH D25.479.517 – liposomes
- MeSH D25.479.517.500 – unilamellar liposomes
- MeSH D25.479.709 – phytosomes
- MeSH D25.479.900 – virosomes

=== MeSH D25.583 – mouthwashes ===
- MeSH D25.583.820 – saliva, artificial

=== MeSH D25.720 – polymers ===
- MeSH D25.720.099 – biopolymers
- MeSH D25.720.099.500 – cellulose
- MeSH D25.720.099.500.252 – cellophane
- MeSH D25.720.099.500.439 – collodion
- MeSH D25.720.099.500.719 – hypromellose derivatives
- MeSH D25.720.099.625 – latex
- MeSH D25.720.099.687 – lignin
- MeSH D25.720.099.718 – plant mucilage
- MeSH D25.720.099.750 – rubber
- MeSH D25.720.099.750.500 – latex
- MeSH D25.720.150 – carbon fiber
- MeSH D25.720.200 – colestipol
- MeSH D25.720.259 – cyanoacrylates
- MeSH D25.720.259.341 – enbucrilate
- MeSH D25.720.259.341.110 – bucrylate
- MeSH D25.720.327 – elastomers
- MeSH D25.720.327.390 – neoprene
- MeSH D25.720.327.782 – polyurethanes
- MeSH D25.720.327.811 – polyvinyl chloride
- MeSH D25.720.327.840 – rubber
- MeSH D25.720.327.840.119 – gutta-percha
- MeSH D25.720.327.840.239 – latex
- MeSH D25.720.327.900 – silicone elastomers
- MeSH D25.720.395 – fluorocarbon polymers
- MeSH D25.720.395.616 – polytetrafluoroethylene
- MeSH D25.720.395.616.755 – proplast
- MeSH D25.720.470 – hexadimethrine bromide
- MeSH D25.720.501 – microgels
- MeSH D25.720.517 – molecularly imprinted polymers
- MeSH D25.720.532 – nanogels
- MeSH D25.720.532.500 – hydrogel, polyethylene glycol dimethacrylate
- MeSH D25.720.593 – organically modified ceramics
- MeSH D25.720.716 – plastics
- MeSH D25.720.716.195 – biodegradable plastics
- MeSH D25.720.716.294 – microplastics
- MeSH D25.720.716.392 – nylons
- MeSH D25.720.716.507 – polyethylenes
- MeSH D25.720.716.507.500 – polyethylene
- MeSH D25.720.716.507.600 – polyethyleneimine
- MeSH D25.720.716.550 – polypropylenes
- MeSH D25.720.716.579 – polystyrenes
- MeSH D25.720.716.579.159 – cholestyramine resin
- MeSH D25.720.716.650 – polyurethanes
- MeSH D25.720.716.721 – polyvinyls
- MeSH D25.720.716.721.616 – polyvinyl alcohol
- MeSH D25.720.716.721.812 – polyvinyl chloride
- MeSH D25.720.716.721.838 – povidone
- MeSH D25.720.716.721.838.745 – povidone-iodine
- MeSH D25.720.716.822 – resins, synthetic
- MeSH D25.720.716.822.111 – acrylic resins
- MeSH D25.720.716.822.111.001 – polyacrylamides
- MeSH D25.720.716.822.111.650 – polymethacrylic acids
- MeSH D25.720.716.822.111.650.605 – methylmethacrylates
- MeSH D25.720.716.822.111.650.605.450 – methylmethacrylate
- MeSH D25.720.716.822.111.650.605.500 – polymethyl methacrylate
- MeSH D25.720.716.822.111.650.750 – polyhydroxyethyl methacrylate
- MeSH D25.720.716.822.300 – bone cements
- MeSH D25.720.716.822.308 – composite resins
- MeSH D25.720.716.822.308.200 – bisphenol a-glycidyl methacrylate
- MeSH D25.720.716.822.308.300 – compomers
- MeSH D25.720.716.822.461 – epoxy resins
- MeSH D25.720.716.822.730 – resin cements
- MeSH D25.720.719 – polyacetylene polymer
- MeSH D25.720.722 – polyanetholesulfonate
- MeSH D25.720.728 – polyesters
- MeSH D25.720.728.700 – polydioxanone
- MeSH D25.720.728.764 – polyethylene terephthalates
- MeSH D25.720.728.772 – polyglactin 910
- MeSH D25.720.728.780 – polyglycolic acid
- MeSH D25.720.728.780.500 – polylactic acid-polyglycolic acid copolymer
- MeSH D25.720.741 – polyethylene glycols
- MeSH D25.720.741.250 – cetomacrogol
- MeSH D25.720.741.485 – hydrogel, polyethylene glycol dimethacrylate
- MeSH D25.720.741.575 – nonoxynol
- MeSH D25.720.741.610 – octoxynol
- MeSH D25.720.741.630 – polidocanol
- MeSH D25.720.741.650 – poloxalene
- MeSH D25.720.741.667 – poloxamer
- MeSH D25.720.741.685 – polyhydroxyethyl methacrylate
- MeSH D25.720.741.700 – polysorbates
- MeSH D25.720.780 – polygeline
- MeSH D25.720.795 – polyphloretin phosphate
- MeSH D25.720.830 – pyran copolymer
- MeSH D25.720.900 – siloxanes
- MeSH D25.720.900.850 – silicones
- MeSH D25.720.900.850.150 – dimethylpolysiloxanes
- MeSH D25.720.900.850.150.750 – simethicone
- MeSH D25.720.900.850.900 – silicone elastomers
- MeSH D25.720.900.850.905 – silicone gels
- MeSH D25.720.900.850.950 – silicone oils
- MeSH D25.720.950 – stimuli responsive polymers

=== MeSH D25.860 – smart materials ===
- MeSH D25.860.250 – shape memory alloys
- MeSH D25.860.500 – stimuli responsive polymers

=== MeSH D25.919 – tissue adhesives ===
- MeSH D25.919.367 – cyanoacrylates
- MeSH D25.919.367.341 – enbucrilate
- MeSH D25.919.367.341.110 – bucrylate

The list continues at List of MeSH codes (D26).
