= Stephan Sigrist =

German academic

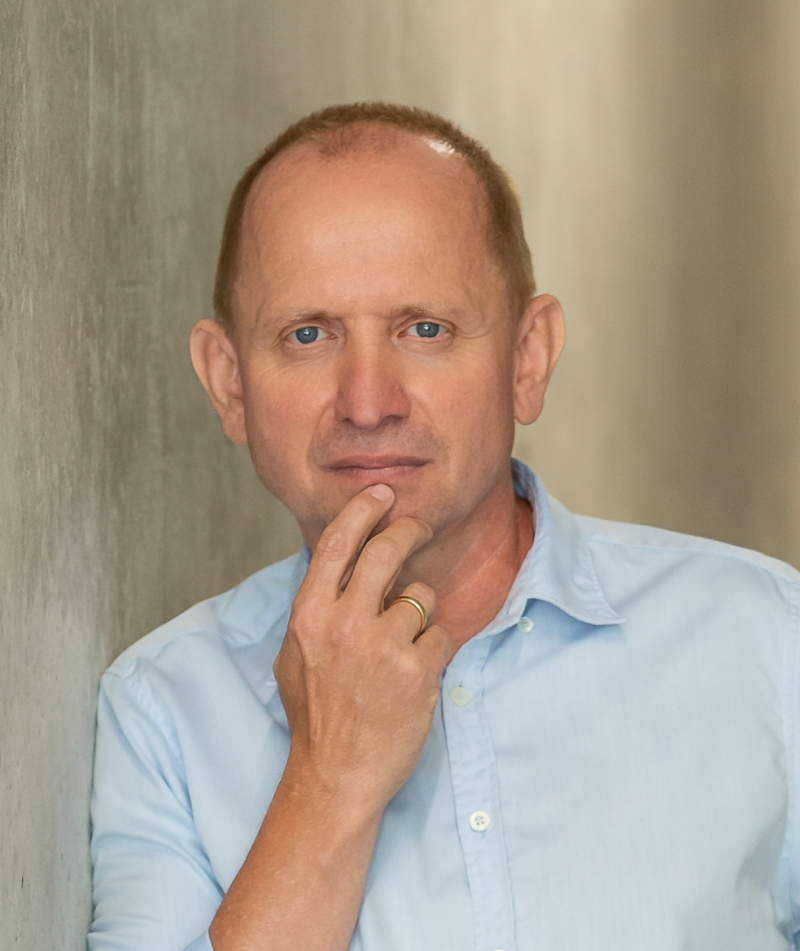
Stephan Sigrist (2024)

Stephan Sigrist (*September 9, 1967, in Freiburg im Breisgau) is a German geneticist, neurobiologist, and biochemist. He is a professor of genetics at the Department of Biology, Chemistry, and Pharmacy at the Free University of Berlin.

== Education ==
Stephan Sigrist studied chemistry at the Technische Universität Berlin and biochemistry at the Eberhard Karls University of Tübingen, where he received his diploma in 1993. In 1997, he earned his doctorate at the Friedrich Miescher Laboratory of the Max Planck Society in Tübingen and completed his habilitation in 2005 at the University Medical Center Göttingen, where he received an award for the best habilitation.

== Research and teaching ==
From 2001, Sigrist led a research group at the European Neuroscience Institute in Göttingen, focusing on neuroplasticity, using the fruit fly Drosophila melanogaster as a model to study the molecular basis of learning and memory processes. In 2008, he took up a professorship in molecular developmental genetics at the Free University of Berlin. Since 2009, he has also been a board member of the NeuroCure Cluster of Excellence at Charité – Universitätsmedizin Berlin. Sigrist and his team make use of techniques such as super-resolution light microscopy (STED) and live imaging of synaptic protein dynamics. His research on spermidine, a molecule that can halt age-related memory loss, has led to clinical studies exploring its potential in treating dementia. In 2014, Sigrist was named an "Einstein Professor" by the Einstein Foundation Berlin. In 2023, he received an ERC Advanced Grant for research on brain resilience and was elected to the European Molecular Biology Organization.

== Publications (selection) ==
- with Christian F. Lehner: Drosophila fizzy-related down-regulates mitotic cyclins and is required for cell proliferation arrest and entry into endocycles. In: Cell, Vol. 90(4). Elsevier, Amsterdam 1997, ISSN 0092-8674, pp. 671–681.
- Postsynaptic translation affects the efficacy and morphology of neuromuscular junctions. In: Nature, Vol. 405(6790). Macmillan Publishers, London 2000, ISSN 0028-0836, pp. 1062–1065.
- with Tobias Rasse and others: Glutamate receptor dynamics organizing synapse formation in vivo. In: Nature Neuroscience, Vol. 8(7). Nature Publishing Group, London 2005. ISSN 1097-6256, pp. 898–905.
- with Robert J. Kittel and others: Bruchpilot promotes active zone assembly, Ca2+ channel clustering, and vesicle release. In: Science, Vol. 312(5776). AAAS, Washington 2006, ISSN 0036-8075, pp. 1051–1054.
- with Dhananjay Wagh and others: Bruchpilot, a protein with homology to ELKS/CAST, is required for structural integrity and function of synaptic active zones in Drosophila. In: Neuron, Vol. 49(6). Cell Press, Cambridge (USA) 2006, ISSN 0896-6273, pp. 833–844.
- with Annina Schmid and others: Activity-dependent site-specific changes of glutamate receptor composition in vivo. In: Nature Neuroscience, Vol. 11(6). Nature Publishing Group, London 2008, ISSN 1097-6256, pp. 659–666.
- with David Owald and others: A Syd-1 homologue regulates pre- and postsynaptic maturation in Drosophila. In: Journal of Cell Biology, Vol. 188(4). Rockefeller University Press, New York City 2010, ISSN 0021-9525, pp. 565–579.
- with Ke-Shun Liu and others: RIM-binding protein, a central part of the active zone, is essential for neurotransmitter release. In: Science, Vol. 334(6062). AAAS, Washington 2011, ISSN 0036-8075, pp. 1565–1569.
- with David Owald and others: Cooperation of Syd-1 with Neurexin synchronizes pre- with postsynaptic assembly. In: Nature Neuroscience, Vol. 15(9). Nature Publishing Group, London 2012, ISSN 1097-6256, pp. 1219–1226.
- with Vinod Kumar Gupta and others: Restoring polyamines protects from age-induced memory impairment in an autophagy-dependent manner. In: Nature Neuroscience, Vol. 16(10). 2013, pp. 1453–1460.
- with Mathias A. Böhme and others: Active zone scaffolds differentially accumulate Unc13 isoforms to tune Ca(2+) channel-vesicle coupling. In: Nature Neuroscience, Vol. 19(10). Nature Publishing Group, London 2016, ISSN 1097-6256, pp. 1311–1320.
- with Anuradha Bhukel and others: Autophagy within the mushroom body protects from synapse aging in a non-cell autonomous manner. In: Nature Communications, Vol. 10(1). Nature Publishing Group, London 2019, eISSN 2041-1723, p. 1318.
- with Atefeh Pooryasin and others: Unc13A and Unc13B contribute to the decoding of distinct sensory information in Drosophila. In: Nature Communications, Vol. 12(1). Nature Publishing Group, London 2021, eISSN 2041-1723, p. 1932.
- with Tina Ghelani and others: Interactive nanocluster compaction of the ELKS scaffold and Cacophony Ca(2+) channels drives sustained active zone potentiation. In: Science Advances, Vol. 9(7). AAAS, Washington 2023, ISSN 2375-2548, p. eade7804.
- with Sila Rizalar and others: Phosphatidylinositol 3,5-bisphosphate facilitates axonal vesicle transport and presynapse assembly. In: Science, Vol. 382(6667). AAAS, Washington 2023, ISSN 0036-8075, pp. 223–230.
