= Sandy Beach =

Sandy Beach may refer to:

== Gaming ==
- Sandy Beach (video game)

== Canada ==
- Sandy Beach, Alberta, a village
- Sandy Beach, Saskatchewan, a defunct village
- Sandy Beach Regional Park, a park in Saskatchewan

== United States ==
- Sandy Beach (Oahu), a beach in Hawaii
- Sandy Beach, New York, a hamlet

== See also ==
- Sand Beach (disambiguation)
- Beach (disambiguation)
- Sand (disambiguation)
