= Protamine =

Protamine 1

Identifiers
- Symbol: PRM1
- NCBI gene: 5619
- HGNC: 9447
- OMIM: 182880
- RefSeq: NM_002761
- UniProt: P04553

Other data
- Locus: Chr. 16 p13.13
Search for
- Structures: Swiss-model
- Domains: InterPro

Protamine 2

Identifiers
- Symbol: PRM2
- NCBI gene: 5620
- HGNC: 9448
- OMIM: 182890
- RefSeq: NM_002762
- UniProt: P04554

Other data
- Locus: Chr. 16 p13.13
Search for
- Structures: Swiss-model
- Domains: InterPro

Protamines are small, arginine-rich, nuclear proteins that replace histones late in the haploid phase of spermatogenesis and are believed essential for sperm head condensation via genomic DNA compaction and stabilization. They may allow for denser packaging of DNA in the spermatozoon than histones, but they must be decompressed before the genetic data can be used for protein synthesis. However, part of the sperm's genome is packaged by histones (10-15% in humans and other primates) thought to bind genes that are essential for early embryonic development.

Protamine and protamine-like (PL) proteins are collectively known as the sperm-specific nuclear basic proteins (SNBPs). The PL proteins are intermediate in structure between protamine and Histone H1. The C-terminal domain of PL could be the precursor of vertebrate protamine.

== Spermatogenesis ==
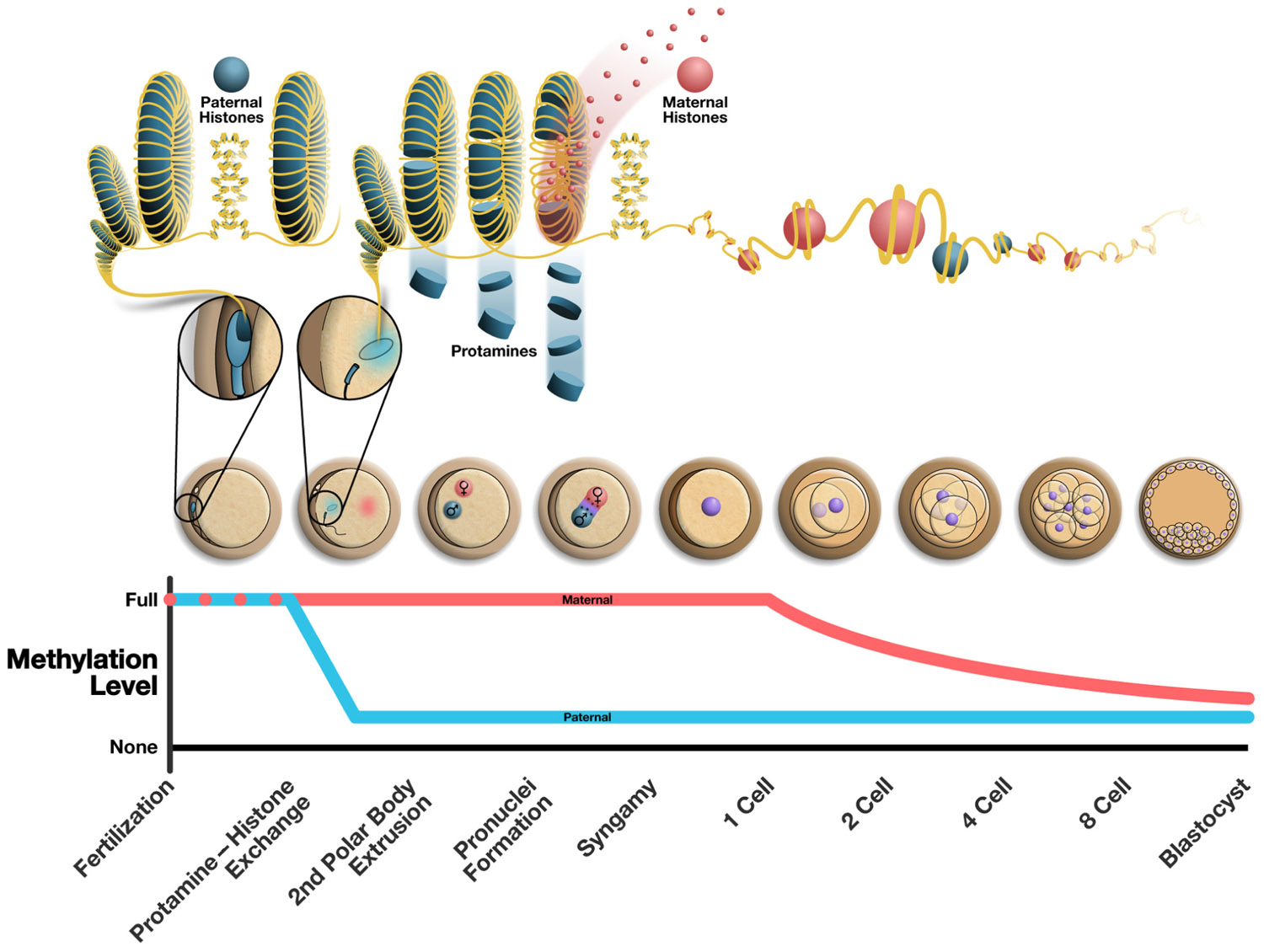
Alterations to the epigenome post-fertilization. The upper part of the image shows replacement of protamines with histones in paternal pronucleus shortly after fertilization. DNA packaged with protamines forms toroid-shaped structures, shown at the top left corner of the image.

During the formation of sperm, protamine binds to the phosphate backbone of DNA using the arginine-rich domain as an anchor. DNA is then folded into a toroid, an O-shaped structure, although the mechanism is not known. A sperm cell can contain up to 50,000 toroid-shaped structures in its nucleus with each toroid containing about 50 kilobases. Before the toroid is formed, histones are removed from the DNA by transition nuclear proteins, so that protamine can condense it. The effects of this change are 1) an increase in sperm hydrodynamics for better flow through liquids by reducing the head size 2) decrease in the occurrence of DNA damage 3) removal of the epigenetic markers that occur with histone modifications.

The structure of the sperm head is also related to protamine levels. The ratio of protamine 2 to protamine 1 and transition nuclear proteins has been found to change the sperm head shape in various species of mice, by altering the expression of protamine 2 via mutations in its promoter region. A decrease in the ratio has been found to increase the competitive ability of sperm in Mus species. However, further testing is required to determine how this ratio influences the shape of the head and whether monogamy influences this selection. In humans, studies show that men who have unbalanced Prm1/Prm2 are subfertile or infertile. Protamine 2 is encoded as a longer protein that needs its N-terminal cleaved before becoming functional. Human and chimp protamine has undergone rapid evolution.

== Medical uses ==
When mixed with insulin, protamines slow down the onset and increase the duration of insulin action (see NPH insulin).

Protamine is used in cardiac surgery, vascular surgery, and interventional radiology procedures to neutralize the anti-clotting effects of heparin. Adverse effects include increased pulmonary artery pressure and decrease peripheral blood pressure, myocardial oxygen consumption, cardiac output, and heart rate.

Protamine sulfate is an antidote for heparin overdose, but severe allergy may occur. A chain shortened version of protamine also acts as a potent heparin antagonist, but with markedly reduced antigenicity. It was initially produced as a mixture made by thermolysin digestion of protamine, but the actual effective peptide portion VSRRRRRRGGRRRR has since been isolated. An analogue of this peptide has also been produced.

In gene therapy, protamine sulfate's ability to condense plasmid DNA along with its approval by the U.S. Food and Drug Administration (FDA) have made it an appealing candidate to increase transduction rates by both viral and nonviral (e.g. utilizing cationic liposomes) mediated delivery mechanisms.

Protamine may be used as a drug to prevent obesity. Protamine has been shown to deter increases in body weight and low-density lipoprotein in high-fat diet rats. This effect occurs through the inhibition of lipase activity, an enzyme responsible for triacylglycerol digestion and absorption, resulting in a decrease in the absorption of dietary fat. No liver damage was found when the rats were treated with protamine. However, emulsification of long-chain fatty acids for digestion and absorption in the small intestine is less constant in humans than rats, which will vary the effectiveness of protamine as a drug. Furthermore, human peptidases may degrade protamine at different rates, thus further tests are required to determine protamine's ability to prevent obesity in humans.

== Species distribution and isoforms ==
Mice, humans and certain fish have two or more different protamines, whereas the sperm of bull and boar, have one form of protamine due to a mutation in the PRM2 gene. In the rat, although the gene for PRM2 is present, expression of this protein is extremely small because of limited transcription due to an inefficient promoter in addition to altered processing of the mRNA transcript.

=== Mammals ===
The 2 human protamines are denoted PRM1 and PRM2. In mice and humans, PRM1, PRM2, and TNP2 are co-located in a conserved gene cluster.

Eutherian mammals generally have both PRM1 and PRM2. Metatherians on the other hand only have a homolog to P1.

=== Fish ===
Fish protamine are generally shorter than that of mammals, with a higher amount of arginine.

Examples of protamines from fish are:

- salmine and protamine sulfate from salmon
- clupeine from herring sperm (Clupea)
- iridine from rainbow trout
- thinnine from tunafish (Thunnus)
- stelline from starry sturgeon (Acipenser stellatus)
- scylliorhinine from dogfish (Scylliorhinus)

== Sequence ==
Protamine P1

Identifiers
- Symbol: Protamine_P1
- Pfam: PF00260
- InterPro: IPR000221
- PROSITE: PDOC00047
Available protein structures:
- PDB: IPR000221 PF00260 (ECOD; PDBsum)
- AlphaFold: IPR000221; PF00260

Protamine P2

Identifiers
- Symbol: Protamine_P2
- Pfam: PF00841
- InterPro: IPR000492
Available protein structures:
- PDB: IPR000492 PF00841 (ECOD; PDBsum)
- AlphaFold: IPR000492; PF00841

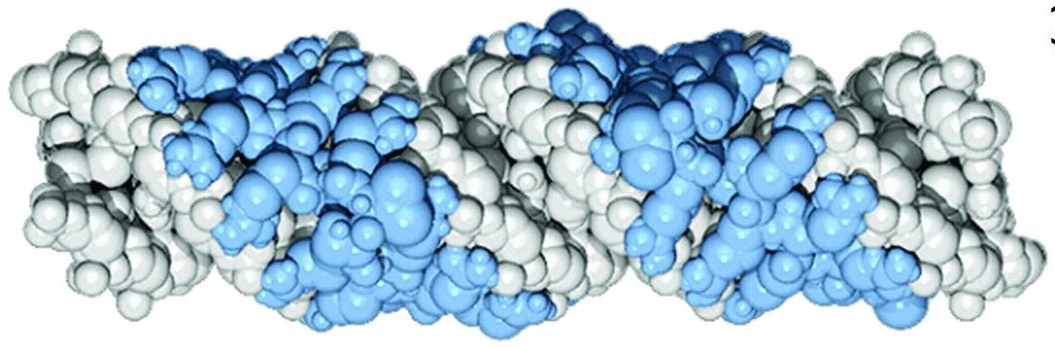
Theoretical model of two adjacent salmon protamine molecules (blue) wrapped around and bound within the major groove the DNA helix (white). Protamine binding neutralizes the phosphodiester backbone of DNA, causing it to coil into toroidal structures.

The primary structure of protamine P1, the protamine used for packaging DNA in sperm cells, in placental mammals is usually 49 or 50 amino acids long. This sequence is divided into three separate domains: an arginine-rich domain for DNA binding flanked by shorter peptide sequences containing mostly cysteine residues. The arginine-rich domain consists of 3-11 arginine residues and is conserved between fish protamine and mammalian protamine 1 sequences at about 60-80% sequence identity.

== Structure ==
After translation, the protamine P1 structure is immediately phosphorylated at all three of the above-mentioned domains. Another round of phosphorylation occurs when the sperm enters the egg, but the function of these phosphorylations is uncertain.

The exact secondary and tertiary structure of protamine is not known with certainty, but several proposals have been published since the 1970s. The broad consensus is that protamine forms beta strand structures that then crosslink through disulfide bonds (and potentially dityrosine and cysteine-tyrosine bonds). When protamine P1 binds to DNA, cysteine from the amino terminal of one protamine P1 forms disulfide bonds with the cysteine from the carboxy-terminal of another protamine P1. By neutralizing the backbone charge protamine enables the DNA to more tightly coil. The disulfide bonds function to prevent the dissociation of protamine P1 from DNA until the bonds are reduced when the sperm enters the egg. These long protamine polymers may then wrap around the DNA within the major groove.

The positively charged protamine has the capacity to condense various polyanions. Recent findings indicate that salmon protamine forms a wide range of liquid and solid condensates or aggregates with both single-stranded and double-stranded DNA, as well as with glycosaminoglycans.

== See also ==
- Epigenetics
- Chromosome
