= Sand Beach =

A sand beach is a beach consisting primarily of sand.

Sand Beach may also refer to:

== Canada ==
- Sand Beach, Nova Scotia

== United States ==
- Sand Beach, Pennsylvania
- Sand Beach Township, Michigan
- Sand Beach Church, in Owasco, New York
- Sand Beach in Acadia National Park, Bar Harbor, Maine

== See also ==
- Sandy Beach (disambiguation)
- Beach (disambiguation)
- Sand (disambiguation)
