= Anne Spang =

German biochemist, cell biologist and academic (born 1967)

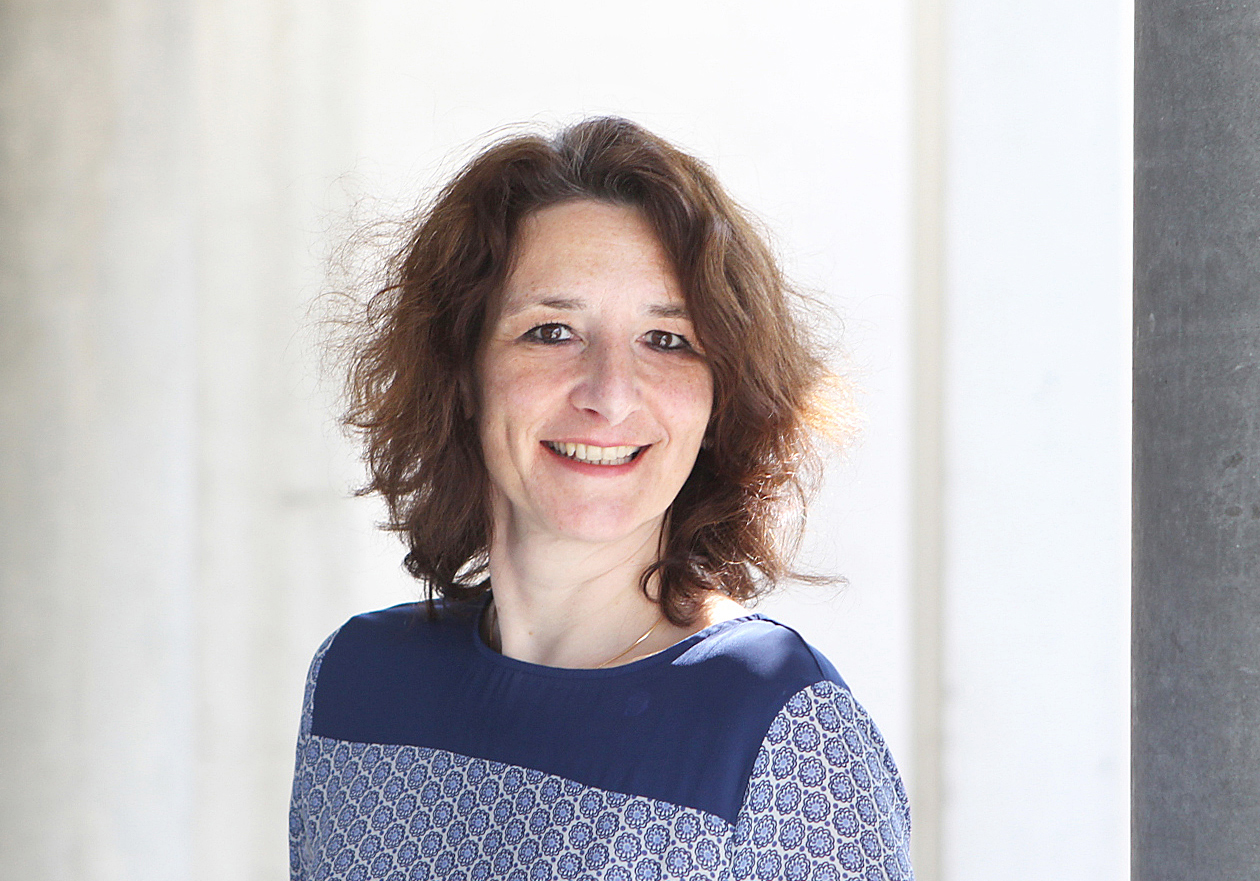
- Spang in 2015
- Born: 29 November 1967 (age 58); Wadern
- Scientific career
- Fields: Biochemist/Cell Biologist
- Workplaces: Darmstadt University of Applied Sciences; Pierre-and-Marie-Curie University; University of California, Berkeley; The Friedrich Miescher Laboratory of the MPG; Biozentrum University of Basel

Anne Spang (born 29 November 1967 in Wadern) is a German biochemist and cell biologist. She is a Professor at the Biozentrum University of Basel in Switzerland.

== Life ==
Anne Spang studied Chemical Engineering at the University of Applied Sciences in Darmstadt and Biochemistry at the University of Paris VI, France. She received her PhD in 1996 at the Max-Planck Institute of Biochemistry in Martinsried. She was then a postdoctoral fellow at the University of California, Berkeley, USA. From 1999 to 2006 she was an Independent Research Group Leader at the Friedrich Miescher Laboratory of the Max Planck Society in Tübingen. Since 2005 Anne Spang has held the position of Professor of Biochemistry and Cell Biology at the Biozentrum University of Basel.

== Work ==
Anne Spang investigates the basics of intracellular transport. Spang gained an international reputation through her discovery of the maturation process from early to late endosomes. In the nematode, Caenorhabditis elegans, she has identified the evolutionary conserved SAND-1 protein, which serves as the switch in Rab conversion during the maturation process. In addition, her research has shown that ArfGAP proteins are important for the uptake of cargo into transport vesicles and that the small GTPase Arf1 and COPI components play a role in mRNA transport and mRNA metabolism. Her research findings are significant for the understanding of many diseases which are based on the location of defects in protein and mRNA in the cell, such as cystic fibrosis and lysosomal storage disorders.

== Awards and honors ==
- 2024: Elected member of the American Association for the Advancement of Sciences (AAAS)
- 2021: Elected member of the German National Academy of Sciences Leopoldina
- 2010: Binder Innovation Prize
- 2009: Elected member of the European Molecular Biology Organization (EMBO)
- 2005: Walther Flemming Medal of the German Society for Cell Biology
- 2002: EMBO Young Investigator
