= Friedrich Miescher =

Swiss biochemist (1843–1895)

Johannes Friedrich Miescher
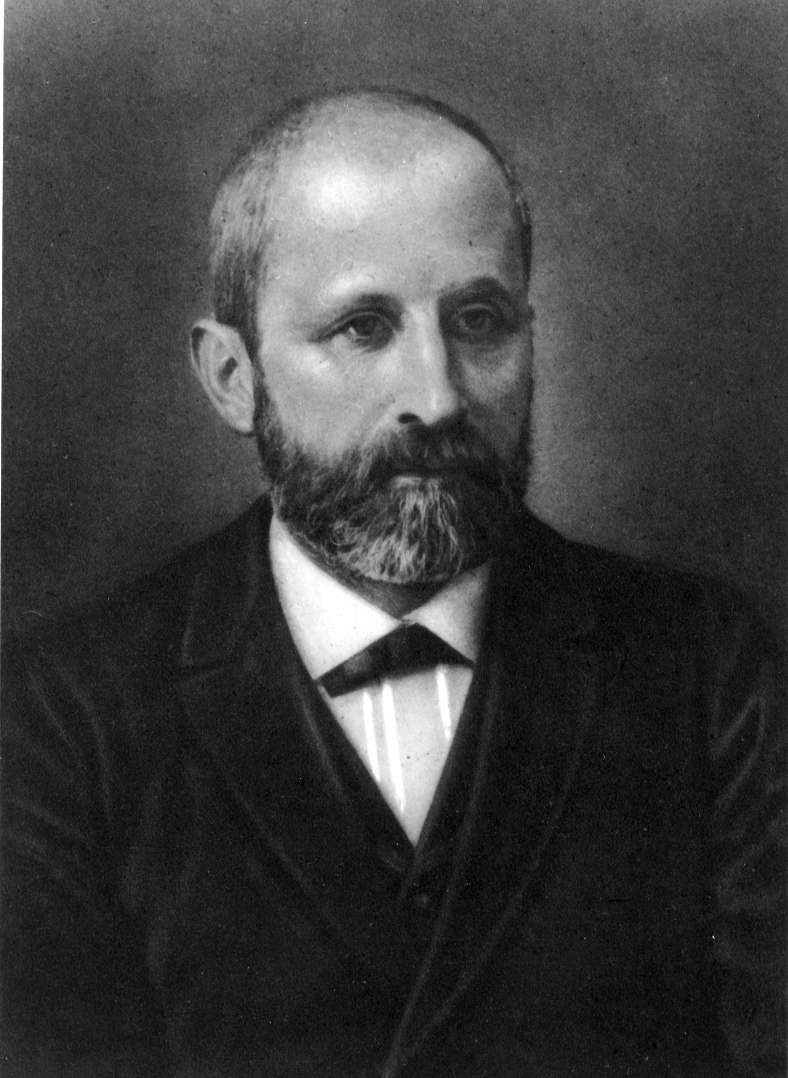
- Born: 13 August 1844; Basel, Switzerland
- Died: 26 August 1895 (aged 51); Davos, Switzerland
- Education: University of Göttingen (M.D.)
- Known for: Discovery of nucleic acid
- Spouse: Maria Anna Rüsch
- Scientific career
- Fields: Biology

Johannes Friedrich Miescher (13 August 1844 – 26 August 1895) was a Swiss physician and biologist. He was the first scientist to isolate nucleic acid in 1869. Miescher also identified protamine and made several other discoveries.

Miescher had isolated various phosphate-rich chemicals, which he called nuclein (now nucleic acids), from the nuclei of white blood cells in Felix Hoppe-Seyler's laboratory at the University of Tübingen, Germany, paving the way for the identification of DNA as the carrier of inheritance. The significance of the discovery, first published in 1871, was not at first apparent, and Albrecht Kossel made the initial inquiries into its chemical structure. Later, Miescher raised the idea that the nucleic acids could be involved in heredity and even posited that there might be something akin to an alphabet that might explain how variation is produced.

== Early life and education ==
Friedrich Miescher came from a scientific family and was the oldest of 5 sons, and was known within his family as Fritz. Miescher's father and his uncle held the chair of anatomy at the University of Basel until Miescher's father resigned in 1850. Friedrich grew up in combined household with his Uncle, Wilhelm His. The combined household's were credited with creating an intellectual stimulus for everyone. As a boy, Miescher was shy but intelligent. He had an interest in music as his father performed publicly. Miescher studied medicine at Basel, and in the summer of 1865, he worked for the organic chemist Adolf Strecker at the University of Göttingen. However, Miescher's studies were interrupted for the year when he contracted typhoid fever, leaving him hearing-impaired. Miescher received his MD in 1868.

== Job ==
=== Physiological chemistry ===
Miescher felt that his partial deafness would be a disadvantage as a doctor, so he turned to physiological chemistry. Miescher originally wanted to study lymphocytes, but was encouraged by Felix Hoppe-Seyler to study neutrophils. Miescher was interested in studying the chemistry of the nucleus. Lymphocytes were difficult to obtain in sufficient numbers to study, while neutrophils were known to be one of the main and first components in pus and could be obtained from bandages at the nearby hospital. However, the problem was washing the cells off the bandages without damaging them.

=== Discovery of nuclein ===
Miescher devised different salt solutions, eventually producing one with sodium sulfate. The cells were filtered, and since centrifuges were not available at the time, the cells were allowed to settle to the bottom of a beaker. He then tried to isolate the nuclei free of cytoplasm. Miescher subjected the purified nuclei to an alkaline extraction followed by acidification, resulting in the formation of a precipitate that he called nuclein (now known as DNA). Miescher found that this contained phosphorus and nitrogen, but not sulfur. Hoppe-Seyler repeated all of Miescher's research himself before publishing it in his journal because one of his earlier student's false claims.

=== Basel professorship and later research ===
Miescher then went on to study physiology at Leipzig in the laboratory of Carl Ludwig for a year before being appointed professor of physiology at the University of Basel.

While analyzing the composition of salmon sperm, Miescher also discovered the alkaline substance protamine, the account of which he published in 1874. It later found use, as protamine sulfate, in the stabilization of insulin (NPH insulin) and also as a reversal agent for the anticoagulant medicine heparin.

Miescher and his students researched much nucleic acid chemistry, but its function remained unknown. However, Miescher's discovery played an important part in the identification of nucleic acids as the carriers of inheritance. The importance of his discovery was not apparent until Albrecht Kossel (a German physiologist specializing in the physiological chemistry of the cell and its nucleus and of proteins) researched the chemical structure of nuclein.

Miescher is also known for demonstrating that carbon dioxide concentrations in blood regulate breathing.

== Personal life ==
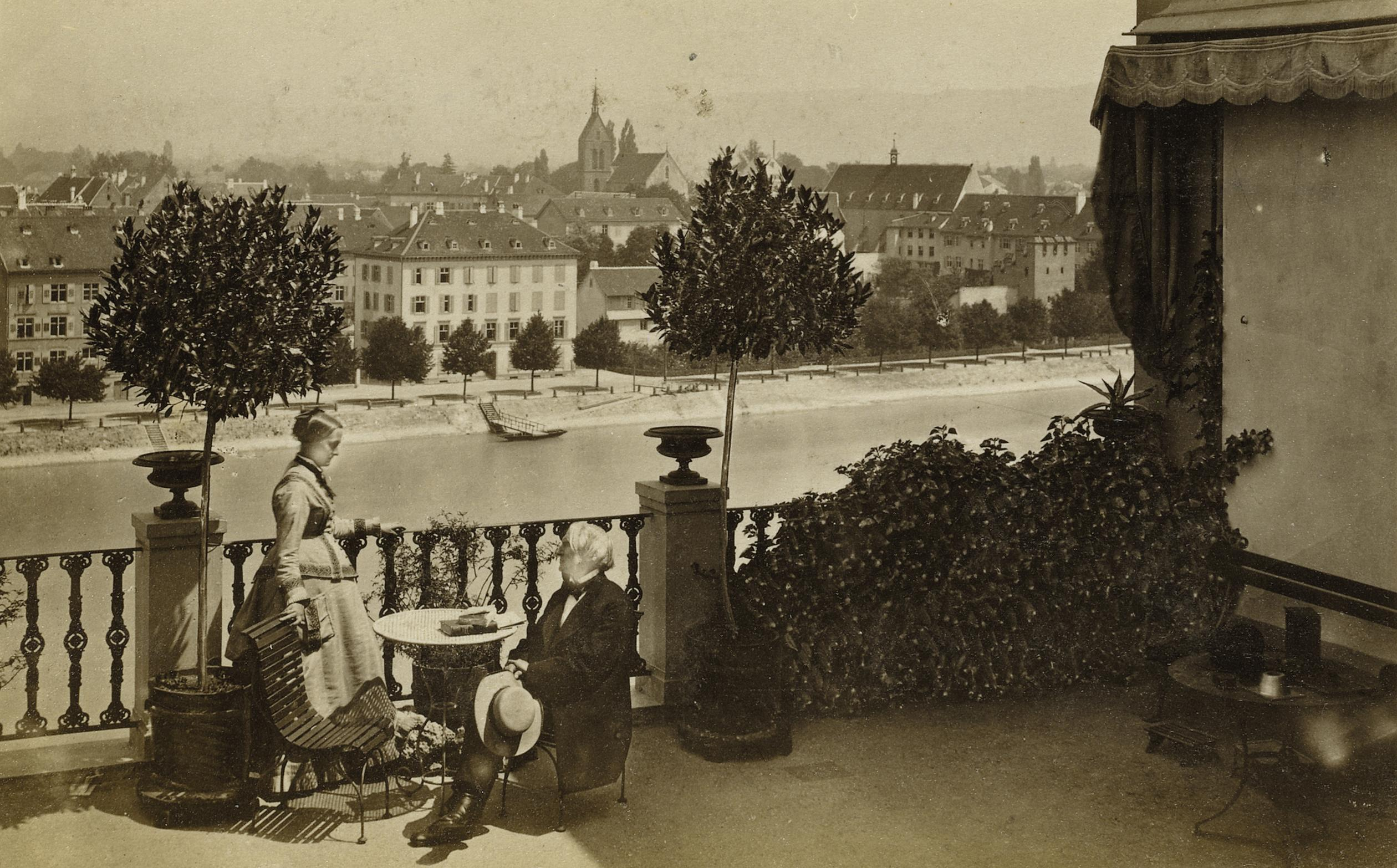
Friedrich Miescher on 21 Augustinergasse's terrace.

Miescher was married to Maria Anna Rüsch on March 21, 1878. According to Miescher's own student Fritz Suter, Miescher missed his own wedding and was found in his laboratory. Miescher had 3 children with Rüsch all of which died at a young age. The Miescher family moved to their home on 21 Augustinergasse sometime after 1878 and before 1887.

Due to Miescher's lack of sleep, overwork, and cold conditions of his laboratory, he was susceptible to illness and contracted pleurisy in 1885. Miescher neglected his condition and continued to work long hours, and in 1894 he contracted tuberculosis. He then had to retire and moved to a sanatorium in Davos in the Swiss Alps. He died of tuberculosis in 1895 at the age of 51. In Miescher's obituary in the British Medical journal, his wife and children are not mentioned, showing Miescher's dedication to his work.

== Legacy ==
As of 2008, two laboratories have been named after Miescher: The Friedrich Miescher Laboratory of the Max Planck Society in Tübingen and the Friedrich Miescher Institute for Biomedical Research in Basel, founded in 1970 by Ciba-Geigy. An award was also named after Miescher called the "Friedrich Miescher award", given to young biochemists for outstanding scientific work either carried out in Switzerland or by a Swiss scientist.

== See also ==
- Friedrich Miescher Institute for Biomedical Research
- Friedrich Miescher Laboratory of the Max Planck Society

== Bibliography ==
- Dahm, R (Feb 2005). "Friedrich Miescher and the discovery of DNA". Developmental Biology. 278 (2): 274–88. doi:10.1016/j.ydbio.2004.11.028. ISSN 0012-1606. PMID 15680349.
- Maderspacher, F (Aug 2004). "Rags before the riches: Friedrich Miescher and the discovery of DNA". Current Biology. 14 (15): R608. doi:10.1016/j.cub.2004.07.039. ISSN 0960-9822. PMID 15296772.
- Knill, Rl (May 1993). "Practical CO2 monitoring in anaesthesia". Canadian Journal of Anesthesia. 40 (5 Pt 2): R40–9. doi:10.1007/BF03020684. ISSN 0832-610X. PMID 8500212.
- Merke, F (Jan 1973). "Forgotten fundamental physiological studies of migrating salmon by Basel's physiologist, Friedrich Miescher". Gesnerus. 30 (1–2): 47–52. doi:10.1163/22977953-0300102006. ISSN 0016-9161. PMID 4581278. S2CID 248488146.
- James, J (Mar 1970). "Miescher's discoveries of 1869. A centenary of nuclear chemistry". Journal of Histochemistry and Cytochemistry. 18 (3): 217–9. doi:10.1177/18.3.217. ISSN 0022-1554. PMID 4908150.
- Ostrowski, W (1970). "From nucleic acids to DNA. On the 100th anniversary of the discovery of nucleic acids by Friedrich Miescher". Postepy Biochemii. 16 (4): 581–7. ISSN 0032-5422. PMID 4921671.
- De, Meuron-Landolt, M (Jan 1970). "Johannes Friedrich Miescher: his personality and the importance of his work". Bulletin der Schweizerischen Akademie der Medizinischen Wissenschaften. 25 (1–2): 9–24. ISSN 0036-7494. PMID 4910336.
- Bernhard, K (Jan 1971). "Jonhannes Friedrich Miescher Symposium. 100th anniversary of the discovery of nucleic acids. Welcome". Bulletin der Schweizerischen Akademie der Medizinischen Wissenschaften. 25 (1–2): 32–4. ISSN 0036-7494. PMID 4908661.
- Harbers, E (Oct 1969). "On the discovery of DNA by Friedrich Miescher 100 years ago". German Medical Monthly. 14 (10): 517–8. ISSN 0016-8785. PMID 4903604.
- Harbers, E (Sep 1969). "On the discovery of DNA by Friedrich Miescher 100 years ago". Deutsche Medizinische Wochenschrift. 94 (38): 1948–9. ISSN 0012-0472. PMID 4897532.
- Buess, H (Feb 1953). "Joh. Friedrich Miescher and the contribution of Basle physicians to the biology of the nineteenth century". The Yale Journal of Biology and Medicine. 25 (4): 250–61. ISSN 0044-0086. PMC 2599305. PMID 13049881.
- Miescher, Friedrich (1871). "Ueber die chemische Zusammensetzung der Eiterzellen". Medicinisch-chemische Untersuchungen. 4: 441–460.
- Greenstein JP (1943). "Friedrich Miescher, 1844-1895". The Scientific Monthly. 57 (5): 523–532. Bibcode:1943SciMo..57..523G. JSTOR 18231.
- Meyer Friedman and Gerald W. Friedland, Medicine's 10 Greatest Discoveries, ISBN 0-300-08278-9, pp. 194–196.
- Veigl, Harman, Lamm, "Friedrich Miescher's Discovery in the Historiography of Genetics", Journal of the History of Biology 53:3, 2020
