= Sande =

Sande may refer to:

== Places ==
=== Norway ===
- Sande Municipality (Møre og Romsdal), a municipality in Møre og Romsdal county
- Sande Municipality (Vestfold), a former municipality in Vestfold county
- Sande, Agder, a village in Farsund Municipality in Agder county
- Sande, Vestland, village in Sunnfjord Municipality in Vestland county
- Sande Station, a railway station in Holmestrand municipality in Vestfold county
- Sande Church (disambiguation)

=== Other places ===
- Sande, Angola, a city and commune in Bié province, Angola
- Sande, Lower Saxony, a municipality in the district of Friesland, Lower Saxony, Germany
- Sande, Paderborn, North Rhine-Westphalia, Germany

== People ==
- Sande (surname)

== Other ==
- Sande society, a women's society of Liberia, Sierra Leone and Guinea
- Sande, the wood of Brosimum utile

== See also ==
- Sand (disambiguation)
- Enge-Sande, Schleswig-Holstein, Germany
- Van de Sande, a surname
