= Sand Church =

Sand Church may refer to:

- Sand Church (Innlandet), a church in Nord-Odal municipality in Innlandet county, Norway
- Sand Church (Nordland), a church in Hadsel municipality in Nordland county, Norway
- Sand Church (Rogaland), a church in Suldal municipality in Rogaland county, Norway

== See also ==
- Sanda Church, Gotland, Sweden
- Sande Church (disambiguation), a list of similarly named churches
