= Sand battery =

Sand battery may refer to:

- An electrochemical battery with a wet sand electrolyte, first used by the British and Irish Magnetic Telegraph Company
- Thermal battery, using sand as a heat storage medium

== See also ==
- Sand (disambiguation)
- Battery (disambiguation)
