= OR2B11 =

Protein-coding gene in humans

Identifiers
- Aliases: OR2B11, olfactory receptor family 2 subfamily B member 11
- External IDs: MGI: 3030056; GeneCards: OR2B11

Gene location (Human)
Chr.	Chromosome 1 (human)
Band	1q44	Start	247,449,118 bp
Band	1q44	End	247,458,105 bp

Gene location (Mouse)
Chr.	Chromosome 11 (mouse)
Band	11|11 B1.3	Start	59,461,081 bp
Band	11|11 B1.3	End	59,467,061 bp
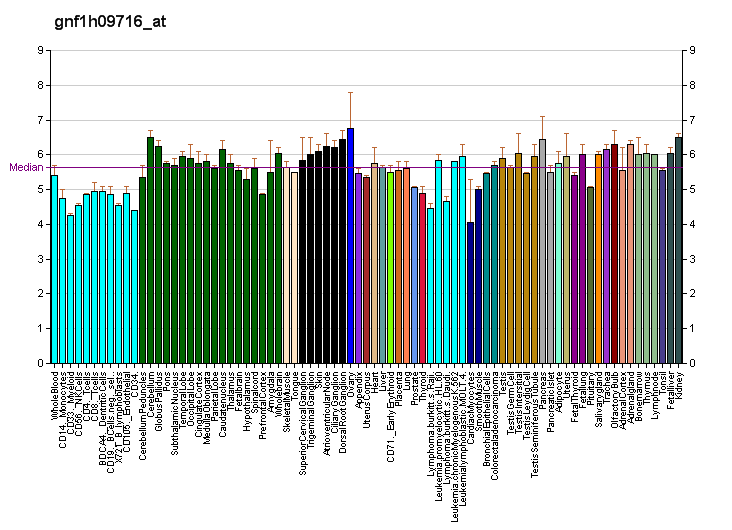
RNA expression pattern
Bgee	Human / Mouse (ortholog); Top expressed in: granulocyte; monocyte; bone marrow; blood; sural nerve; gallbladder; appendix; placenta; ventricular zone; lymph node / Top expressed in: embryo; respiratory epithelium; nasal epithelium; olfactory epithelium; More reference expression data
BioGPS	More reference expression data
Gene ontology
Molecular function	G protein-coupled receptor activity; signal transducer activity; olfactory receptor activity
Cellular component	plasma membrane; membrane; integral component of membrane
Biological process	signal transduction; response to stimulus; detection of chemical stimulus involved in sensory perception of smell; sensory perception of smell; G protein-coupled receptor signaling pathway
Sources:Amigo / QuickGO
Orthologs
Databases	NCBI: entry; OMA: entry
Species	Human	Mouse
Entrez	127623	257962
Ensembl	ENSG00000177535	ENSMUSG00000059610
UniProt	Q5JQS5	Q7TS30
RefSeq (mRNA)	NM_001004492	NM_001011789
RefSeq (protein)	NP_001004492	NP_001011789
Location (UCSC)	Chr 1: 247.45 – 247.46 Mb	Chr 11: 59.46 – 59.47 Mb
PubMed search
- Wikidata
View/Edit Human	View/Edit Mouse

Olfactory receptor 2B11 is a protein that in humans is encoded by the OR2B11 gene.

Olfactory receptors interact with odorant molecules in the nose, to initiate a neuronal response that triggers the perception of a smell. The olfactory receptor proteins are members of a large family of G protein-coupled receptors (GPCR) arising from single coding-exon genes. Olfactory receptors share a 7-transmembrane domain structure with many neurotransmitter and hormone receptors and are responsible for the recognition and G protein-mediated transduction of odorant signals. The olfactory receptor gene family is the largest in the genome. The nomenclature assigned to the olfactory receptor genes and proteins for this organism is independent of other organisms.

== See also ==
- Olfactory receptor
