= Sand Point =

Sand Point may refer to:

== Canada ==
- Sand Point, Ontario, a community
- Sand Point, Nova Scotia (disambiguation)
- Sand Point (Lake Temagami), a beach on Lake Temagami, Ontario
- Sandpoint is one of several locations on Babine Lake, British Columbia, comprising Babine Lake Marine Provincial Park

== England ==
- Sand Point, Somerset, a peninsula in North Somerset in Great Britain

== United States ==
- Sand Point (peninsula), a peninsula in Lake Washington, Seattle
- Sand Point, Seattle, a neighborhood near the Sand Point peninsula
- Sand Point, Alaska, a community
- Sandpoint, Idaho, a city
- Sand Point Light, a lighthouse located near Escanaba, Michigan, on Lake Michigan's northern shore
- Sand Point, Oklahoma, a census-designated place
