= Bacterial recombination =

Type of bacterial reproduction by DNA transfer

Bacterial recombination is a type of genetic recombination in bacteria characterized by DNA transfer from one organism called donor to another organism as recipient. This process occurs in three main ways:

- Transformation, the uptake of exogenous DNA from the surrounding environment.
- Transduction, the virus-mediated transfer of DNA between bacteria.
- Conjugation, the transfer of DNA from one bacterium to another via cell-to-cell contact.

The final result of conjugation, transduction, and/or transformation is the production of genetic recombinants, individuals that carry not only the genes they inherited from their parent cells but also the genes introduced to their genomes by conjugation, transduction, and/or transformation.

Recombination in bacteria is ordinarily catalyzed by a RecA type of recombinase. These recombinases promote repair of DNA damages by homologous recombination.

The ability to undergo natural transformation is present in at least 67 bacterial species. Natural transformation is common among pathogenic bacterial species. In some cases, the DNA repair capability provided by recombination during transformation facilitates survival of the infecting bacterial pathogen. Bacterial transformation is carried out by numerous interacting bacterial gene products.

== Evolution ==
Evolution in bacteria was previously viewed as a result of mutation or genetic drift. Today, genetic exchange, or gene transfer is viewed as a major driving force in the evolution of prokaryotes. This driving force has been widely studied in organisms like E. coli. Bacteria reproduces asexually, where daughter cells are clones of the parent. This clonal nature leads to random mutations that occur during DNA replication that potentially helps bacteria evolve. It was originally thought that only accumulated mutations helped bacteria evolve. In contrast, bacteria also import genes in a process called homologous recombination, first discovered by the observation of mosaic genes at loci encoding antibiotic resistance. The discovery of homologous recombination has made an impact on the understanding of bacterial evolution. The importance of evolution in bacterial recombination is its adaptivity. For example, bacterial recombination has been shown to promote the transfer of multi drug resistance genes via homologous recombination that goes beyond levels purely obtained by mutation.

== Mechanisms of bacterial recombination ==
Bacterial recombination undergoes various different processes. The processes include: transformation, transduction, conjugation and homologous recombination. Homologous recombination relies on cDNA transferring genetic material. Complementary DNA sequences transport genetic material in the identical homologous chromosomes. The paternal and maternal paired chromosomes will align in order for the DNA sequences to undergo the process of crossing over. Transformation involves the uptake of exogenous DNA from the encircling environment. DNA fragments from a degraded bacterium will transfer into the surrounding, competent bacterium resulting in an exchange of DNA from the recipient. Transduction is associated with viral-mediated vectors transferring DNA material from one bacterium to another within the genome. Bacterial DNA is placed into the bacteriophage genome via bacterial transduction. In bacterial conjugation, DNA is transferred via cell-to-cell communication. Cell-to-cell communication may involve plasmids that allow for the transfer of DNA into another neighboring cell. The neighboring cells absorb the F-plasmid (fertility plasmid: inherited material that is present in the chromosome). The recipient and donor cell come into contact during a F-plasmid transfer. The cells undergo horizontal gene transfer in which the genetic material is transferred.

Mechanisms for double-stranded breaks

The RecBCD pathway in homologous recombination repairs the double-strand breaks in DNA that has degraded in bacteria. Base pairs attached to the DNA strands go through an exchange at a Holliday junction. In the second step of bacterial recombination, branch migration. involves the base pairs of the homologous DNA strands to continuously be interchanged at a Holliday junction. This results in the formation of two DNA duplexes. The RecBCD pathway undergoes helicase activity by unzipping the DNA duplex and stops when the nucleotide sequence reaches 5′-GCTGGTGG-3′. This nucleotide sequence is known as the Chi site. RecBCD enzymes will change after the nucleotide sequence reaches the Chi site. The RecF pathway repairs the degradation of the DNA strands.

== See also ==
- Genetic recombination
