= Dieter Oesterhelt =

German biochemist and university professor (1940–2022)

- Born: 10 November 1940; Munich, Gau Munich-Upper Bavaria, Germany
- Died: 28 November 2022 (aged 82); Munich, Germany
- Education: LMU Munich
- Awards: Liebig Medal (1983); Otto Warburg Medal (1991); Werner von Siemens Ring (1999); Albert Lasker Award for Basic Medical Research (2021)
- Scientific career
- Workplaces: University of California, San Francisco; University of Würzburg; Max Planck Society
- Thesis: Zur Kenntnis der Fettsäuresynthetase aus Hefe (1967)
- Doctoral advisor: Feodor Lynen
- Doctoral students: Hartmut Michel; Peter Hegemann
- Other notable students: Axel Brunger (postdoc)
- Website: www.biochem.mpg.de/oesterhelt

Dieter Oesterhelt (10 November 1940 – 28 November 2022) was a German biochemist. From 1980 until 2008, he was director of the Max Planck Institute of Biochemistry, Martinsried.

== Biography ==
Oesterhelt studied chemistry at LMU Munich from 1959 to 1963. From 1964 to 1967, he worked at the Institute of Biochemistry at the same university under Feodor Lynen. He was then a research assistant at the Max Planck Institute for Cell Chemistry until 1969. From 1969 to 1973, he worked as an academic adviser at the Institute for Biochemistry at LMU Munich and carried out work on the structure, function and biosynthesis of the purple membrane of Halobacterium salinarum. In 1975, he became a junior research group leader at the Friedrich Miescher Laboratory in Tübingen. From 1976 to 1979, he was a full professor at the University of Würzburg. Oesterhelt has been a member of the Max Planck Society and director of the Max Planck Institute of Biochemistry, Martinsried, since 1980. He retired in 2008.

In 1969, Oesterhelt went to the University of California at San Francisco, where he joined the lab of Walther Stoeckenius to study the cell membrane of Halobacterium salinarum. He proved that retinaldehyde was contained in a protein of the so-called "purple membrane" of Halobacterium. This protein was isolated and called bacteriorhodopsin. After returned to Germany, Oesterhelt showed that physiological function of bacteriorhodopsin is to pump protons out of the cell. Members of his department at the Max Planck Institute for Biochemistry researched the structure-function relationships of membrane proteins and other microbial rhodopsins such as halorhodopsin, which later became a molecular tool in optogenetics. In 2021, he received the Albert Lasker Award for Basic Medical Research.

Oesterhelt died on 28 November 2022, at the age of 82.

== Honors and awards ==
- Member of the Deutschen Akademie der Technikwissenschaften (acatech)
- 1983: Liebig Medal
- 1989: Member of the Academy of Sciences Leopoldina and the Academia Europaea
- 1990: Karl Heinz Beckurts-Preis
- 1991: Otto Warburg Medal
- 1991: Corresponding Member of the Nordrhein-Westfälischen Akademie der Wissenschaften und der Künste
- 1993: Gregor-Mendel-Medal of the Deutschen Akademie der Naturforscher Leopoldina
- 1998: Alfried-Krupp-Wissenschaftspreis
- 2000: Werner von Siemens Ring
- 2002: Paul-Karrer-Lecture and Medal
- 2004: Officer's Cross of the Order of Merit of the Federal Republic of Germany
- 2011: Wissenschaftspreis: Forschung zwischen Grundlagen und Anwendungen
- 2016: Bayerischer Maximiliansorden für Wissenschaft und Kunst
- 2021: Albert Lasker Award for Basic Medical Research
