= Sande Church =

Sande Church may refer to:

- Sande Church (Gaular), a church in Sunnfjord municipality in Vestland county, Norway
- Sande Church (Sunnmøre), a church in Sande municipality in Møre og Romsdal county, Norway
- Sande Church (Vestfold), a church in Holmestrand municipality in Vestfold county, Norway

== See also ==
- Sand Church (disambiguation), a list of similarly-named churches
- Sanda Church, Gotland, Sweden
