= Sand Lake =

Sand Lake may refer to:

== Places ==
United States

- Sand Lake, Michigan, a village in Kent County, Michigan
- Sand Lake, Iosco County, Michigan
- Sand Lake, Minnesota, an unorganized territory in St. Louis County, Minnesota
- Sand Lake Township, Itasca County, Minnesota
- Sand Lake, New York, a town in Rensselaer County, New York
- Sand Lake, Burnett County, Wisconsin, a town in Burnett County, Wisconsin
- Sand Lake, Sawyer County, Wisconsin, a town in Sawyer County, Wisconsin
- Sand Lake, Polk County, Wisconsin, an unincorporated community in Polk County, Wisconsin
- Sand Lake (Anchorage), a section of Anchorage, Alaska
- West Sand Lake, New York, a hamlet in the Town of Sand Lake
- Sand Lake, New York (hamlet), a hamlet in the Town of Sand Lake

== Lakes ==
Canada

- Sand Lake (Patterson Township, Ontario), Parry Sound District
- Sand Lake (Kearney, Ontario), Parry Sound District
- Sand Lake (Ontario), a list of many other lakes by this name

United States

- Sand Lake (Becker and Clay counties, Minnesota)
- Sand Lake, a lake in Nicollet County, Minnesota
- Sand Lake, a lake in Sibley County, Minnesota
- Sand Lake (Bisby Lakes, New York)
- Sand Lake (Oswegatchie SE, New York)

== Other ==
- Sand Lake National Wildlife Refuge in South Dakota
- Sand Lake Recreation Area in Oregon in the Siuslaw National Forest
