= Sand Mountain =

Sand Mountain may refer to:

== Locations in the United States ==
- Sand Mountain (Alabama), a sandstone plateau in the Appalachian foothills of northeast Alabama (and, to a far lesser extent, extreme northwest Georgia)
- Sand Mountain (Florida), a hill in Florida
- Sand Mountain (Nevada), a singing sand dune in Nevada
- Sand Mountain Volcanic Field, a volcanic field in Oregon
- Sand Mountain (Chester County, Tennessee)

== Fictional ==
- Sand Mountain, a ski resort in the fictional city of Bikini Bottom, in the TV series SpongeBob SquarePants
