= Feodor Lynen =

German biochemist, Nobel Laureate

Feodor Lynen ForMemRS
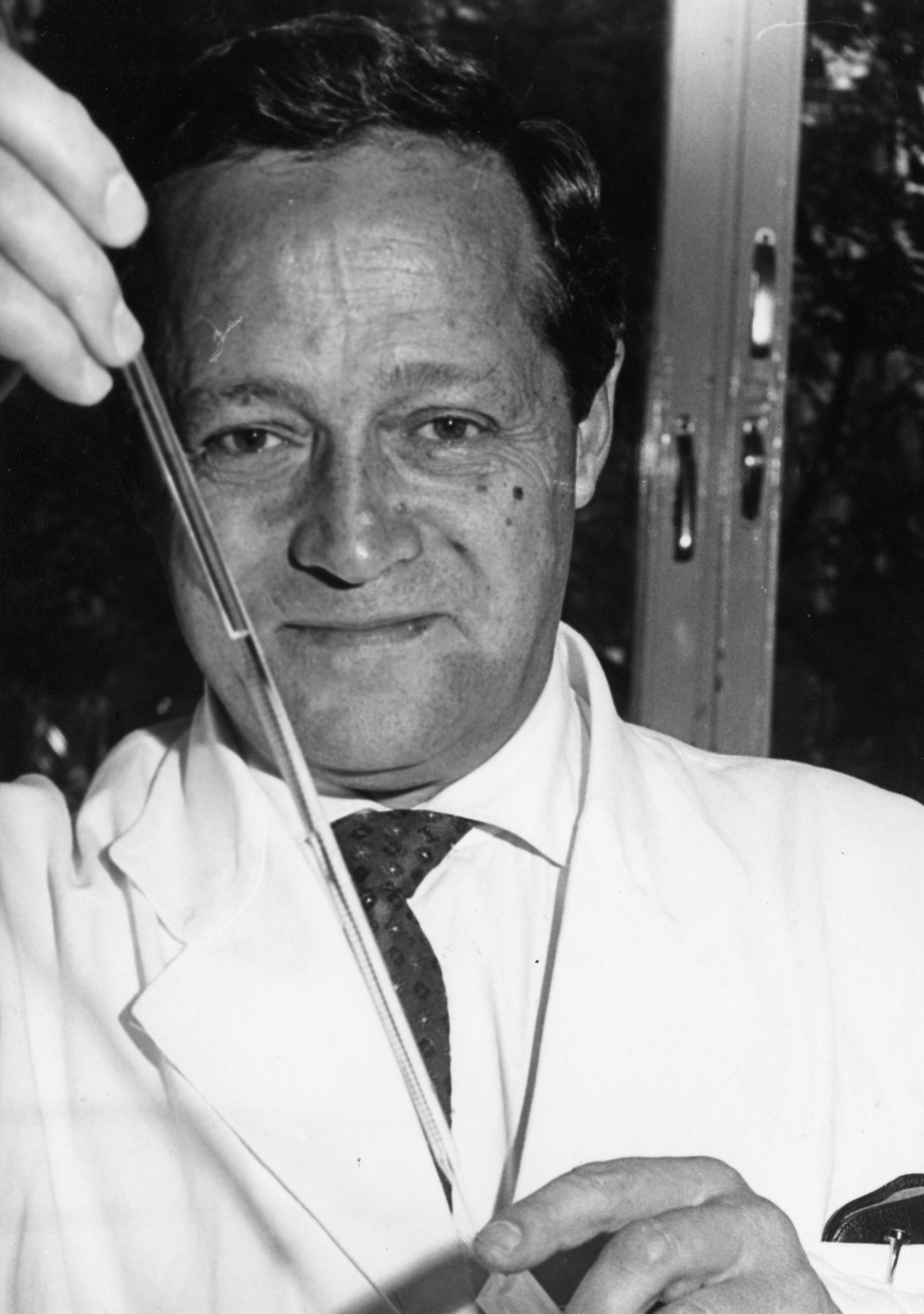
- Born: Feodor Felix Konrad Lynen; 6 April 1911; Munich, German Empire
- Died: 6 August 1979 (aged 68); Munich, West Germany
- Education: LMU Munich
- Known for: Studies of the mechanism and regulation of cholesterol and fatty acid metabolism
- Awards: Nobel Prize in Physiology or Medicine (1964)
- Scientific career
- Workplaces: LMU Munich; Max Planck Society
- Doctoral advisor: Heinrich Otto Wieland
- Doctoral students: Dieter Oesterhelt

Feodor Felix Konrad Lynen ForMemRS (German pronunciation: [ˈfeːodoːɐ̯ ˈlyːnən]; 6 April 1911 – 6 August 1979) was a German biochemist. In 1964, he won the Nobel Prize in Physiology or Medicine together with Konrad Bloch for their discoveries concerning the mechanism and regulation of cholesterol and fatty acid metabolism while he was director of the Max-Planck Institute for Cellular Chemistry in Munich.

== Biography ==
Feodor Lynen was born in Munich on 6 April 1911. His parents were Wilhelm Lynen, who taught mechanical engineering, and Frieda née Prym, whose father was an industrialist. He started his studies at the chemistry department of the Ludwig-Maximilians-Universität München (LMU) in 1930 and graduated in March 1937 under Heinrich Wieland with the work: "On the Toxic Substances in Amanita". Lynen remained in Germany throughout World War II. In 1942, he became a chemistry lecturer at LMU. In 1947, he became an assistant professor and in 1953 a professor of biochemistry. From 1954 onwards, he was director of the Max-Planck Institute for Cellular Chemistry in Munich, a position which was created for him at the instigation of two senior scientists, Otto Warburg and Otto Hahn. In 1972, that institute was merged into the newly founded Max-Planck Institute of Biochemistry in 1972. Also in 1972, Lynen was named President of the Gesellschaft Deutscher Chemiker (GDCh).

In 1964, he won the Nobel Prize in Physiology or Medicine together with Konrad Bloch for their discoveries concerning the mechanism and regulation of cholesterol and fatty acid metabolism. These discoveries took many years to work out. The Nobel Committee felt that this was important because understanding the metabolism of sterols and fatty acids could reveal how cholesterol affects heart disease and stroke. His Nobel Lecture on 11 December 1964 was 'The pathway from "activated acetic acid" to the terpenes and fatty acids'.

Working mostly separately, Lynen and Bloch both discovered the steps that created squalene and turned the squalene into cholesterol. Initially, Lynen found that acetate activated by coenzyme A was required to start the process. He discovered the chemical structure of acetyl-coenzyme A, which was required for a detailed understanding of the biochemical pathways. He also learned that biotin, or Vitamin B7, was required in the process.

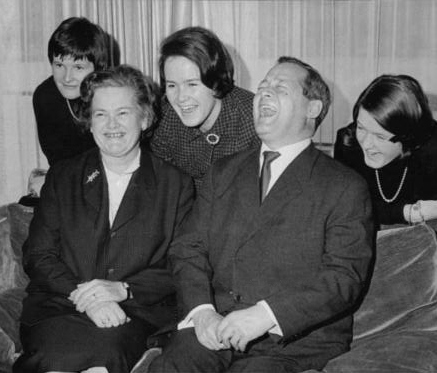
Lynen with family in Stockholm in 1964

On 14 May 1937, Lynen married Eva Wieland (1915–2002), daughter of his academic teacher. They had five children between 1938 and 1946. Feodor Lynen died in Munich, Germany, on 6 August 1979, six weeks after an operation for an aneurysm.

== Fellowship ==
The Alexander von Humboldt Foundation has a fellowship named in his honor.

== Honours and awards ==
- 1962: elected to the American Academy of Arts and Sciences
- 1962: elected to the United States National Academy of Sciences
- 1963: Otto Warburg Medal from the German Society for Biochemistry and Molecular Biology
- 1964: Nobel Prize in Physiology or Medicine (with Konrad Bloch) "for their discoveries concerning the mechanism and regulation of the metabolism of cholesterol and fatty acids"
- 1965: Grand Cross of Merit with Star and Sash of the Federal Republic of Germany
- 1966: elected to the American Philosophical Society
- 1967: Norman Medal of the German Society for Fat Research
- 1971: Pour le Mérite for Science and Art
- 1972: Austrian Decoration for Science and Art
