= PRM2 =

Protein-coding gene in the species Homo sapiens

Identifiers
- Aliases: PRM2, CT94.2, protamine 2
- External IDs: OMIM: 182890; MGI: 97766; GeneCards: PRM2
Available structures
PDB	Ortholog search: PDBe RCSB
PDB	List of PDB id codes 2AWR

Gene location (Human)
Chr.	Chromosome 16 (human)
Band	16p13.13	Start	11,275,639 bp
Band	16p13.13	End	11,276,480 bp

Gene location (Mouse)
Chr.	Chromosome 16 (mouse)
Band	16 A1|16 5.84 cM	Start	10,609,244 bp
Band	16 A1|16 5.84 cM	End	10,613,998 bp
RNA expression pattern
Bgee	Human / Mouse (ortholog); Top expressed in: right testis; male germ cell; left testis; sperm; testicle; caput epididymis; right coronary artery; tail of epididymis; ectocervix; right uterine tube / Top expressed in: seminiferous tubule; spermatid; spermatocyte; morula; zygote; blastocyst; primary oocyte; secondary oocyte; muscle tissue; striated muscle tissue; More reference expression data
BioGPS	n/a
Gene ontology
Molecular function	DNA binding; zinc ion binding; cadmium ion binding
Cellular component	nucleosome; nucleus; nucleoplasm; chromosome
Biological process	multicellular organism development; cell differentiation; chromosome condensation; nucleus organization; spermatid development; spermatogenesis
Sources:Amigo / QuickGO
Orthologs
Databases	NCBI: entry; OMA: entry
Species	Human	Mouse
Entrez	5620	19119
Ensembl	ENSG00000122304	ENSMUSG00000038015
UniProt	P04554	P07978
RefSeq (mRNA)	NM_001286356; NM_001286357; NM_001286358; NM_001286359; NM_002762	NM_008933
RefSeq (protein)	NP_001273285; NP_001273286; NP_001273287; NP_001273288; NP_002753	NP_032959
Location (UCSC)	Chr 16: 11.28 – 11.28 Mb	Chr 16: 10.61 – 10.61 Mb
PubMed search
- Wikidata
View/Edit Human	View/Edit Mouse

Protamine 2 is a protein that in humans is encoded by the PRM2 gene.

== Function ==
Protamines substitute for histones in the chromatin of sperm during the haploid phase of spermatogenesis, and are the major DNA-binding proteins in the nucleus of sperm in many vertebrates. They package the sperm DNA into a highly condensed complex in a volume less than 5% of a somatic cell nucleus.

Many mammalian species have only one protamine (protamine 1); however, a few species, including human and mouse, have two. This gene encodes protamine 2, which is cleaved to give rise to a family of protamine 2 peptides. Alternatively spliced transcript variants have also been found for this gene. [provided by RefSeq, Sep 2015].
