= TNP1 =

Protein-coding gene in the species Homo sapiens

Identifiers
- Aliases: TNP1, TP1, transition protein 1
- External IDs: OMIM: 190231; MGI: 98784; GeneCards: TNP1

Gene location (Human)
Chr.	Chromosome 2 (human)
Band	2q35	Start	216,859,458 bp
Band	2q35	End	216,860,064 bp

Gene location (Mouse)
Chr.	Chromosome 1 (mouse)
Band	1 C3|1 36.94 cM	Start	73,054,233 bp
Band	1 C3|1 36.94 cM	End	73,055,068 bp
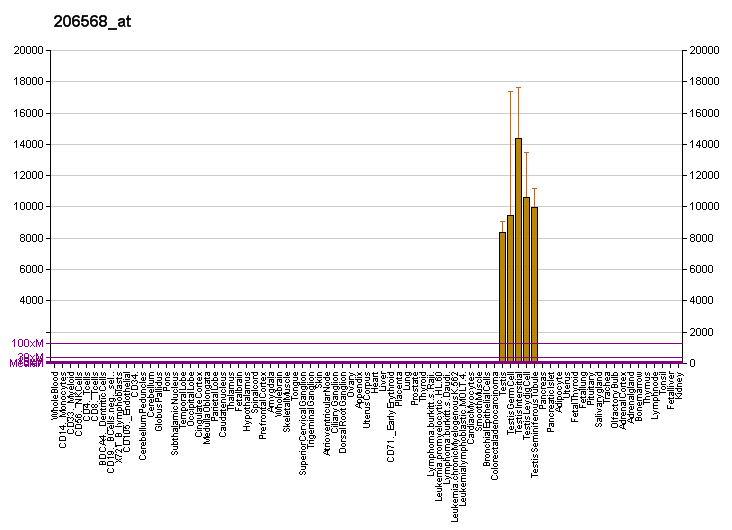
RNA expression pattern
Bgee	Human / Mouse (ortholog); Top expressed in: sperm; right testis; left testis; testicle; cartilage tissue; tail of epididymis; cerebellar vermis; caput epididymis; paraflocculus of cerebellum; corpus epididymis / Top expressed in: seminiferous tubule; spermatid; perirhinal cortex; spermatocyte; entorhinal cortex; interventricular septum; cardiac muscle tissue of left ventricle; plantaris muscle; extensor digitorum longus muscle; choroid plexus of fourth ventricle; More reference expression data
BioGPS	More reference expression data
Gene ontology
Molecular function	DNA binding; protein binding
Cellular component	male germ cell nucleus; nucleosome; chromosome; nucleus
Biological process	multicellular organism development; single strand break repair; flagellated sperm motility; chromatin remodeling; spermatid nucleus differentiation; cell differentiation; spermatid nucleus elongation; nucleosome disassembly; negative regulation of transcription, DNA-templated; sexual reproduction; spermatogenesis; spermatid development; positive regulation of protein processing
Sources:Amigo / QuickGO
Orthologs
Databases	NCBI: entry; OMA: entry
Species	Human	Mouse
Entrez	7141	21958
Ensembl	ENSG00000118245	ENSMUSG00000026182
UniProt	P09430	P10856
RefSeq (mRNA)	NM_003284	NM_009407
RefSeq (protein)	NP_003275	NP_033433
Location (UCSC)	Chr 2: 216.86 – 216.86 Mb	Chr 1: 73.05 – 73.06 Mb
PubMed search
- Wikidata
View/Edit Human	View/Edit Mouse

Spermatid nuclear transition protein 1 is a protein that in humans is encoded by the TNP1 gene.
