= Hexadimethrine bromide =

Names
- IUPAC name 1,5-Dimethyl-1,5-diazaundecamethylene polymethobromide
- Other names Polybrene

Identifiers
CAS Number	28728-55-4
ChemSpider	none
ECHA InfoCard	100.209.698
EC Number	684-236-5
UNII	4C905MSK4W
CompTox Dashboard (EPA)	DTXSID7037684

Properties
Chemical formula	(C_{13}H_{30}Br_{2}N_{2})_{n}, linear form
Molar mass	variable
- Except where otherwise noted, data are given for materials in their standard state (at 25 °C [77 °F], 100 kPa). Infobox references

Hexadimethrine bromide (commercial brand name Polybrene) is a cationic polymer with several uses. In research, it is primarily used to increase the efficiency of transduction of certain cells with viruses (such as retrovirus or lentivirus) in cell culture. Hexadimethrine bromide acts by neutralizing the charge repulsion between virions and sialic acid on the cell surface. Use of Polybrene can improve transduction efficiency 100-1000 fold although it can be toxic to some cell types. Polybrene in combination with DMSO shock is used to transfect some cell types such as NIH-3T3 and CHO. It has other uses, including a role in protein sequencing.

Hexadimethrine bromide also reverses heparin anticoagulation during open-heart surgery, and it was the original reversal agents used in the 1950s and 1960s. It was replaced by protamine sulfate in 1969, after it was shown that hexadimethrine bromide could potentially cause kidney failure in dogs when used in doses in excess of its therapeutic range. It is still used as an alternative to protamine sulfate for patients who are sensitive to protamine, and at least one surgical center has gone back to using it as their standard reversal agent, since protamine sulfate causes at least a mild hypotensive reaction in most or all patients

Hexadimethrine bromide is also used in enzyme kinetic assays in order to reduce spontaneous activation of zymogens that are prone to auto activation.
