= Friedrich Miescher Laboratory of the Max Planck Society =

German research institute

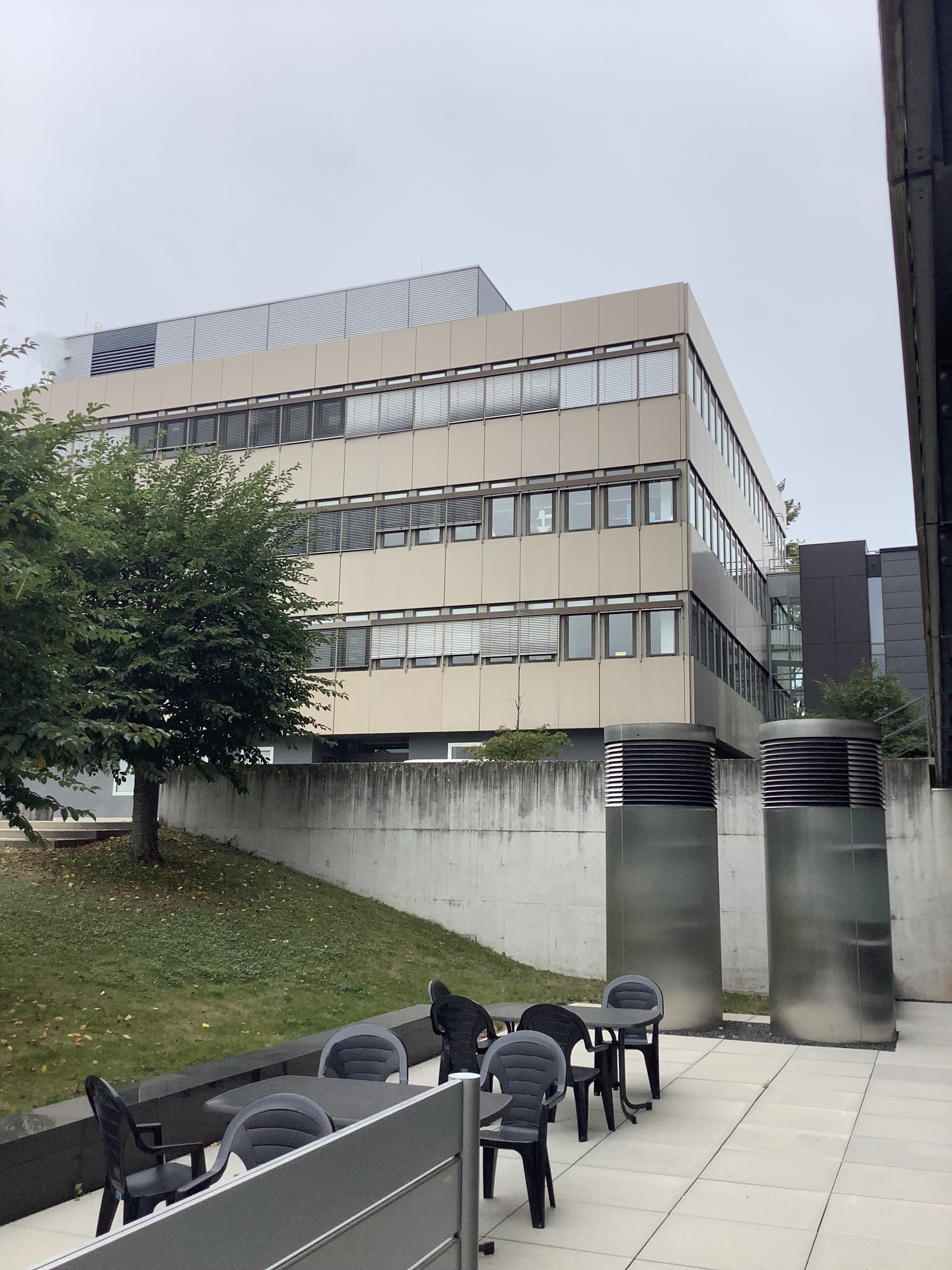
FML in 2019

The Friedrich Miescher Laboratory (FML) of the Max Planck Society is a biological research institute located on the Society's campus in Tübingen, Germany, named after Friedrich Miescher, founded in 1969 to offer highly qualified junior scientists in biology an opportunity to establish independent research groups and pursue their own line of research within a five-year period. There are currently four research groups studying evolutionary genetics, systems biology of development, and the biochemistry of meiotic recombination.

== Profile ==
The Friedrich Miescher Laboratory (FML) of the Max Planck Society is a biological research institute located on the Society's campus in Tübingen, Germany, named after Friedrich Miescher. It was founded in 1969 to offer highly qualified junior scientists in the area of biology an opportunity to establish independent research groups and pursue their own line of research within a five-year period.

The FML was a bold experiment by the Max Planck Society, in response to the brain drain, to place more resources in the hands of junior scientists and make Germany a more attractive research destination.

== Group Leaders ==
The group leaders are elected by a committee of scientists from diverse areas and institutions on the basis of a public tendering procedure.

Since 2005 the FML has been represented by a managing director in order to relieve the group leaders of administrative burdens and to allow them even more time to focus on their research.

There is no specification as to which kind of biological research should be conducted at the FML, and the focus of research changes with the appointment of each new group leader. While at the FML, they can use modern, well-equipped laboratories and work in teams tailored to their ideas. Each group leader is free to allocate their resources as they choose, and in addition there is a central budget for the FML, managed jointly by the group leaders.

Years active

at FML

Current Affiliation
Luisa Pallares
2022 – present
The Friedrich Miescher Laboratory (FML) of the Max Planck Society
John Weir
2017 – present
The Friedrich Miescher Laboratory (FML) of the Max Planck Society
Patrick Müller
2014 – 21
University of Konstanz, Germany
Felicity Jones
2012 – 23
University of Groningen, Netherlands
Frank Chan
2012 – 23
University of Groningen, Netherlands
Wolfram Antonin
2006 – 17
RWTH Aachen University, Germany
Michael Hothorn
2012 – 14
University of Geneva, Switzerland
Silke Hauf
2005 – 13
Virginia Tech, West Virginia, USA
Dmitri Ivanov
2005 – 11

Gunnar Rätsch
2005 – 11
ETH Zurich, Switzerland
Anne Spang
1999 – 06
Biozentrum, University of Basel, Switzerland
Gudrun Schwarzer
2000 – 03
University of Giessen, Germany
Andreas Mayer
1997 – 03
University of Lausanne, Switzerland
Christoph Schuster
1996 – 03
Heidelberg University, Germany
Ralph Rupp
1993 – 99
Adolf Butenandt Institute, LMU Munich, Germany
Alexander Borst
1993 – 99
Max Planck Institute for Biological Intelligence, Martinsried, Germany
Martin Bähler
1991 – 97
University of Münster, Germany
Christian Lehner
1990 – 96

Stefan Jentsch
1988 – 93
Max Planck Institute of Biochemistry, Martinsried, Germany
Jürgen Bolz
1987 – 93
University of Jena, Germany
Claudia Stürmer
1986 – 90
University of Konstanz, Germany
Peter Ekblom
1984 – 90
University of Uppsala, Sweden
Walter Birchmeier
1982 – 88
Max Delbrück Center, Berlin, Germany
Rolf Kemler
1981 – 87

Christiane Nüsslein-Volhard
1981 – 85
Max Planck Institute for Developmental Biology, Tübingen, Germany
Matthias Wabl
1978 – 84
University of California, San Francisco, USA
Heinz Wässle
1977 – 81
Max Planck Institute for Brain Research, Frankfurt, Germany
Wilfried Seifert
1975 – 82

Reinhard Kurth
1975 – 81
Robert Koch Institute, Berlin, Germany
Wolfgang Hennig
1974 – 78

Dieter Oesterhelt
1973 – 74
Max Planck Institute of Biochemistry, Martinsried, Germany
Günter Gerisch
1969 – 75
Max Planck Institute of Biochemistry, Martinsried, Germany
Uli Schwarz
1969 – 74
Shanghai Institute for Advanced Studies, China
Rolf Knippers
1969 – 73
University of Konstanz, Germany
Friedrich Bonhoeffer
1969 – 72
Max Planck Institute for Developmental Biology, Tübingen, Germany
