= PRM1 =

Protein-coding gene in the species Homo sapiens

Identifiers
- Aliases: PRM1, CT94.1, P1, protamine 1
- External IDs: OMIM: 182880; MGI: 97765; GeneCards: PRM1
Available structures
PDB	Ortholog search: PDBe RCSB
PDB	List of PDB id codes 2AWR

Gene location (Human)
Chr.	Chromosome 16 (human)
Band	16p13.13	Start	11,280,841 bp
Band	16p13.13	End	11,281,330 bp
RNA expression pattern
Bgee	Human / Mouse (ortholog); Top expressed in: sperm; right testis; left testis; testicle; caput epididymis; tail of epididymis; right coronary artery; corpus epididymis; ectocervix; canal of the cervix / n/a; More reference expression data
BioGPS	n/a
Gene ontology
Molecular function	DNA binding
Cellular component	nucleosome; nucleus; nucleoplasm; chromosome
Biological process	multicellular organism development; spermatogenesis; cell differentiation; chromosome condensation
Sources:Amigo / QuickGO
Orthologs
Databases	NCBI: entry; OMA: entry
Species	Human	Mouse
Entrez	5619	19118
Ensembl	ENSG00000175646	n/a
UniProt	P04553	P02319
RefSeq (mRNA)	NM_002761	NM_013637
RefSeq (protein)	NP_002752	NP_038665
Location (UCSC)	Chr 16: 11.28 – 11.28 Mb	n/a
PubMed search
- Wikidata
View/Edit Human	View/Edit Mouse

Protamine 1 is a protein that in humans is encoded by the PRM1 gene.
