= Sand River =

Sand River may refer to:

== Canada ==
- Sand River (Alberta), a tributary of the Beaver River
- Sand River (Vancouver Island), a river of British Columbia
- Sand River (Nova Scotia), a protected area of Nova Scotia
  - Sand River, Nova Scotia, a community at the mouth of the river
- Sand River (Ontario)

== South Africa ==
- Sand River (Limpopo), a tributary of the Limpopo
- Sand River (Free State), a tributary of the Vet, renowned because of the Sand River Convention
- Sand River (Mokolo), which becomes the Mokolo River
- Sand River (Mpumalanga), a tributary of the Sabie River

== United States ==
- Sand River (Michigan), a tributary of Lake Superior in Onota Township, Alger County
  - Sand River, Michigan. an unincorporated community at the mouth of the river
- Sand River (Wisconsin), a river of Wisconsin
