= Sand Lake (Becker and Clay counties, Minnesota) =

Lake in the state of Minnesota, United States

- Location within Minnesota
- Location: Becker County and Clay County, Minnesota
- Coordinates: 46°51′54″N 96°10′22″W
- Type: lake

Sand Lake is a lake in Becker County and Clay County, Minnesota, in the United States.

Sand Lake was named for its sandy lake shore.

== See also ==
- List of lakes in Minnesota
