= Sand Mountain (Chester County, Tennessee) =

Mountain in Tennessee, United States

Coordinates: 35.45341°N 88.46338°W

Sand Mountain is a summit in Chester County, Tennessee with an elevation of 735 feet (224 m).

Sand Mountain is covered with a sandy soil, hence the name. The primary coordinates for Sand Mountain places it within the TN 38332 ZIP Code delivery area.
