= Bioenhancer =

Substances which increase efficacy of drugs

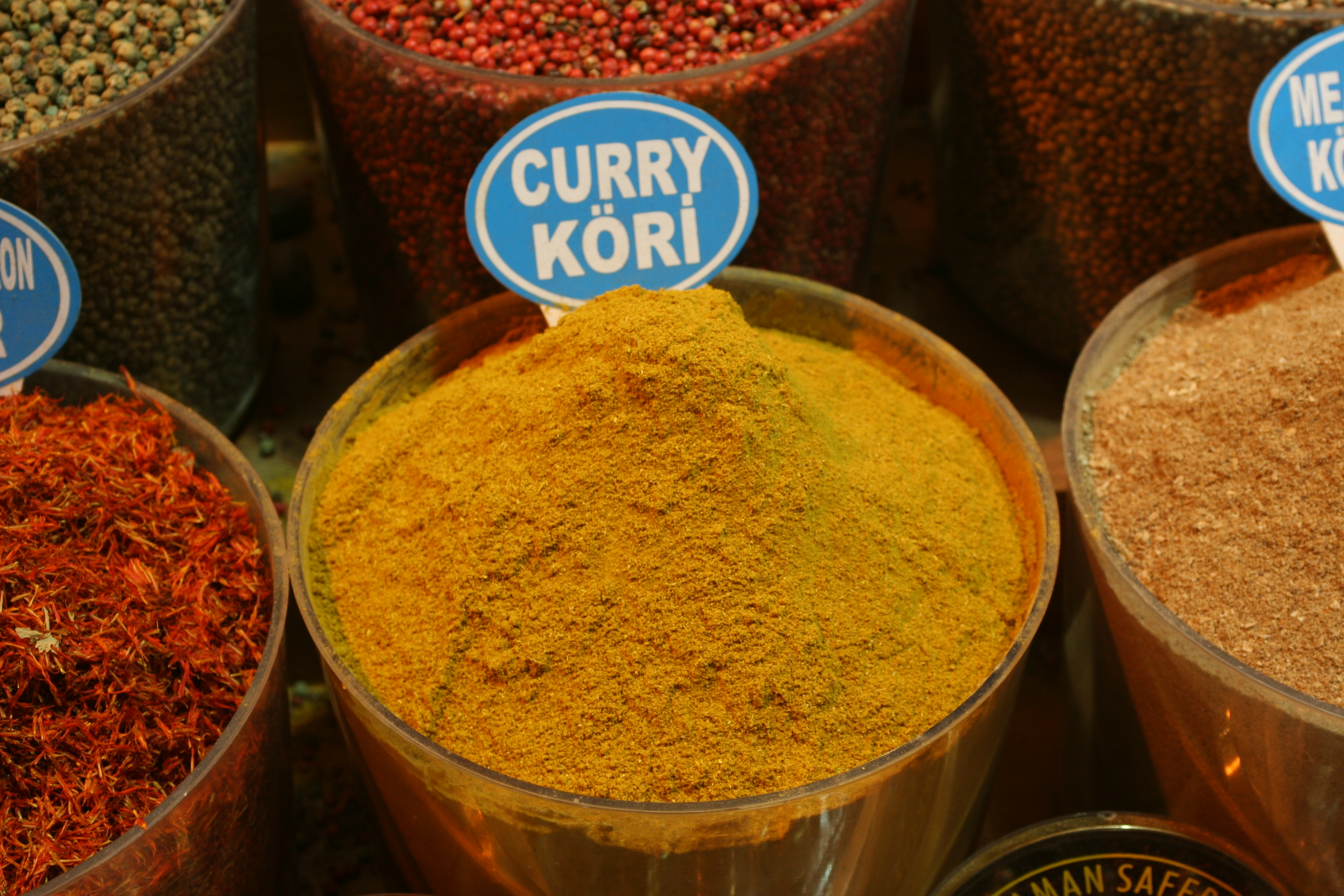
Curry powder contains the bioenhancers curcumin and piperine.

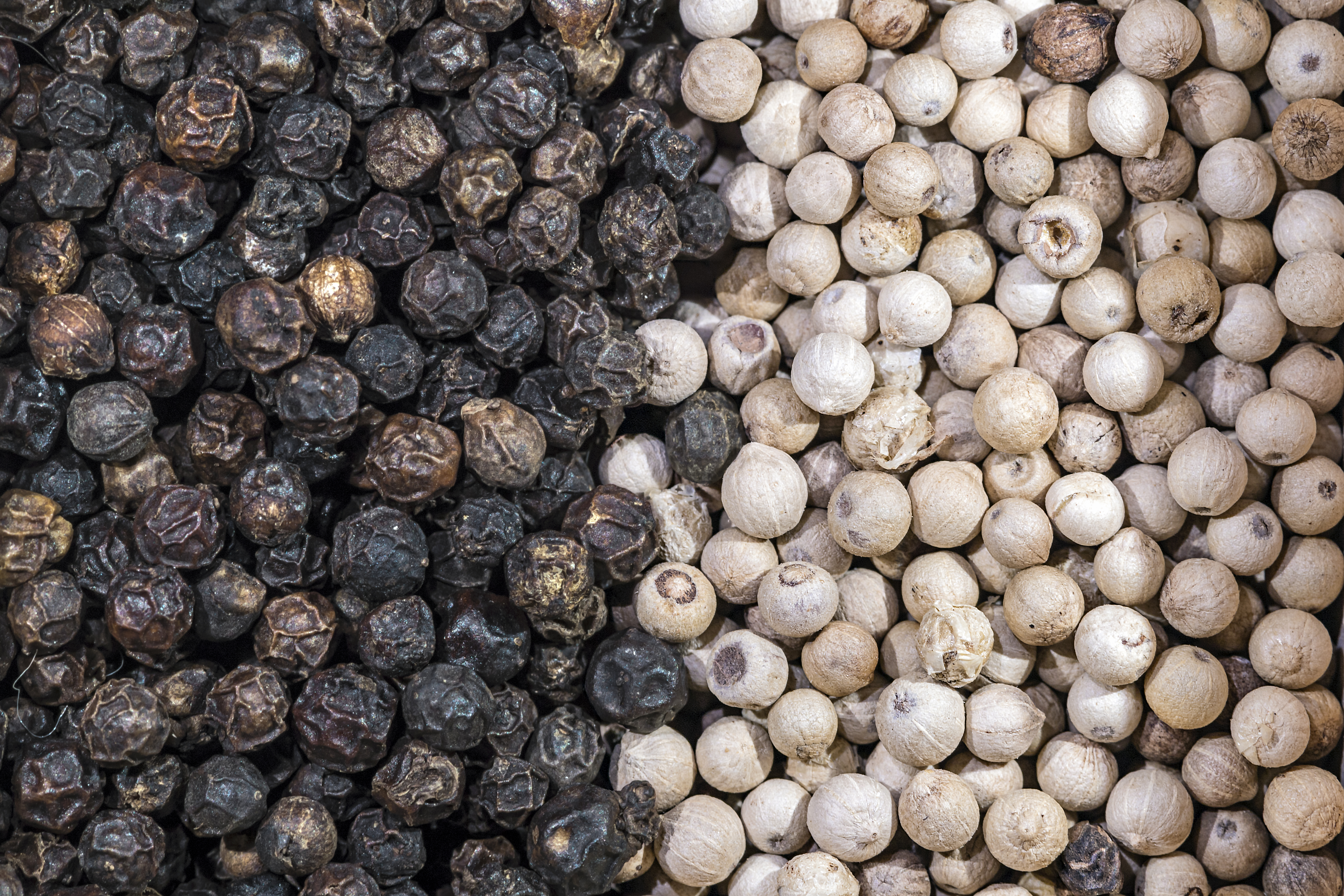
Black Pepper contains high concentrations of piperine.

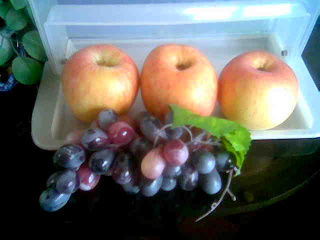
The bioenhancer quercetin is inter alia included in the peel of apples and grapes.

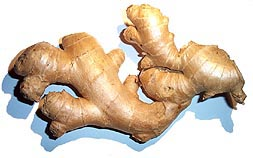
The gingerols from ginger act as bioenhancers.

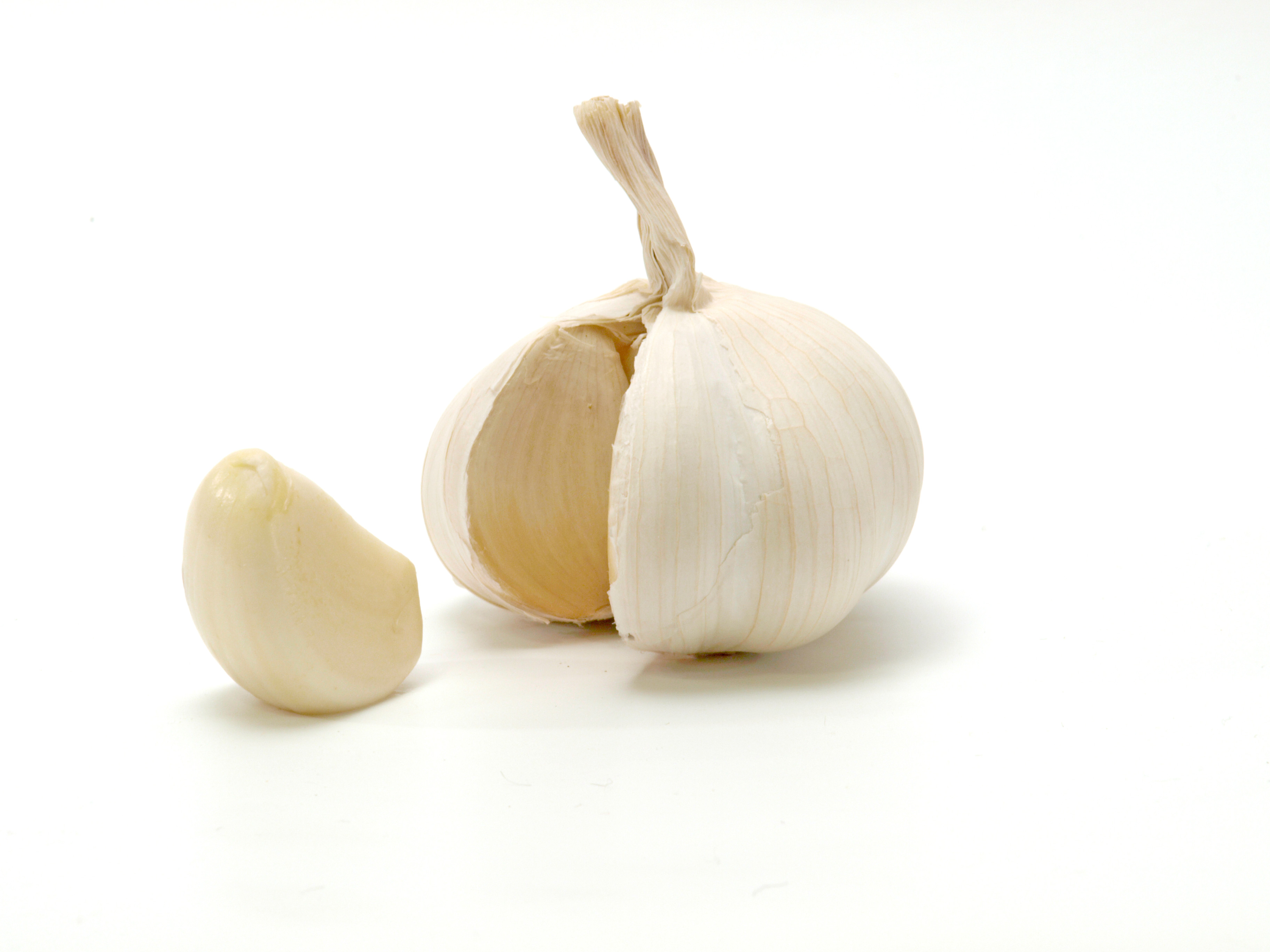
Allicin from garlic enhances the effect of a fungicide.

Bioenhancers are substances that increase the bioavailability leading to increased bioefficacy of active substances with which they are combined without having any pharmacological activity of their own at the dose used. They may enhance bioavailability of allopathic drugs, vitamins, nutrients and toxins depending on its mechanism of action. For example, piperine increases bioavailability of several nutrients such as beta-carotene, vitamin A, vitamin B6, coenzyme Q10, drugs such as phenytoin, theophylline, propanolol and a toxin called aflatoxin B1.

Increased Bioavailabiity means increased levels of drug in the blood stream available for drug action. Increased Bioefficacy means the increased effectiveness of the drug due to increased bioavailability or due to other mechanisms.

== History ==
An observation made in 1929 by Bose describes an increased antiasthmatic activity of vasaka leaves when pepper was added to it. No explanation for this observation was given nor any studies were done to explain the observation. The breakthrough in bioenhancers was finally provided about 50 years later in 1979 by Dr. C. K. Atal, director of RRL Jammu, who was researching on medicinal plants. Bioenhancers or bioavailability enhancers as a term and chapter did not exist in any modern scientific literature prior to 1979. The term bioavailability enhancers was first coined in 1979 at Indian Institute of Integrative medicine, Jammu, formerly RRL, Jammu, by Indian scientists Dr. C. K. Atal, the Director of institute RRL Jammu proposed the hypothesis of increased bioavailability of drugs from a clue during research on traditional medicinal drugs. Subsequently, the concept of bioavailability enhancers was scientifically researched and scientifically established by him and his research team at RRL Jammu. The institute then discovered and scientifically validated Piperine as the world's first bioenhancer using Sparteine and Vasicine which became the world's first experimentally bioenhanced drugs. Dr. Atal also initiated the bioenhanced anti tubercular drug research project using Rifampicin which later resulted in development of world's first bioenhanced anti tubercular drug formulation. This DCGI approved formulation was officially released by Indian government at Anusandhan Bhawan Delhi on world tuberculosis day 2011, and also presented to Mr. Bill Gates, chairman of Microsoft same day at a function at Le Meridian in Delhi.

After the discovery of bioenhancer Piperine in 1979, a new chapter was added in medical science. Since then it has generated global interest and research in the field and has led to discovery of many other new bioenhancers. Piperine remains the most potent and extensively researched bioenhancer till date. It is safe, effective, extremely economical and easily manufactured for commercial use. It is also a broad spectrum bioenhancer acting on several classes of modern drugs as noted elsewhere.

== Classification ==
Bioenhancers can be classified according to their source of origin, either plant based or animal based or else according to their site of action. Bioenhancers so far almost exclusively discovered in plants, increase the bioavailability of other substances in different ways:

- Increase of absorption in the intestine
- Inhibition of degradation in the intestine and the liver by inhibition of drug metabolising enzymes (inhibiting first pass mechanism of destruction of drugs).
- Inhibition of elimination in the drug in gut and through bile by inhibition of efflux pumps.
- Increase of drug permeability of pathogens.
- Inhibition of defense mechanisms of pathogens or tumor tissue (such as efflux of drugs)
- Increasing binding possibilities on binding sites (such as DNA and proteins) of the pathogen
- Improving overcoming of the blood–brain barrier

== Advantages of Bioenhancers ==
=== Reduced dose ===
Bioenhancers prevent this wastage of ingested drugs inside the body and increase quantity of drug reaching the blood, therefore a reduced dosage of oral drug is sufficient to achieve the desired blood levels.

=== Reduced raw material consumption ===
This reduced dose needed for desired drug action means beneficial effect on raw materials consumption required to develop drugs which is a great savings for any country.

=== Ecological advantage ===
This also translates into ecological advantage in case of rare and expensive plant based drugs as less trees or plant have to be consumed to produce drugs, an example being the costly anti cancer drug taxol derived from very slow growing yew trees.

=== Reduced drug cost ===
This reduced dose in turn also reduces the cost of drugs. Billions of dollars are wasted globally in various countries due to poor bioavailability of drugs, which is a huge financial burden on any nation, particularly poor developing countries. This is particularly relevant in serious and dreaded diseases on mankind like tuberculosis for which treatment is expensive, toxic and prolonged and for which an emergency situation has been declared by UN due to emergence of AIDS and development of serious drug resistance.

=== Reduced adverse reactions ===
This reduced dose in turn also reduces the side effects of drugs.

=== Improved compliance ===
Lesser side effects also improve drug tolerability, drug compliance and promote completion of treatment.

=== Reduced drug resistance ===
This improved tolerability and compliance in turn reduces risk of developing dangerous drug resistance.

=== Added hepatoprotective and gastroprotective actions ===
Even though bioenhancers are not pharmacologically active, they can have added benefits such as reduction of gastrointestinal side effects and hepatotoxicity of primary active drug which further makes formulation safer, better tolerated and again reduces drug toxicity and drug resistance.

For example, by reducing the required dose of expensive toxic Rifampicin by 60 percent, it correspondingly reduces the cost and side effects of Rifampicin while treating the dreaded disease Tuberculosis. This is a great advantage to poor patients, poor countries and for dreaded diseases of man.

== Examples of bioenhancers ==
The following examples of bioenhancers give an insight into the current pharmacological research and show how with pepper, curry, ginger and other herbal ingredients in food a lack of nutrients or insufficient effects of active agents can be prevented:

Piperine, an ingredient of pepper, promotes intestinal absorption by activation of the γ-glutamyltranspeptidase and inhibits the degradation of many compounds, by inhibiting different enzymes: aryl hydrocarbon hydroxylase (AHH), ethylmorphine N-demethylase, Uridine diphosphate glucuronic_acid, Uridine diphosphate glucuronyltransferase (UGT), P-glycoprotein, CYP2EI and CYP3A4. Especially the latter two enzymes contribute significantly to the first-pass effect.

Piperine acts as bioenhancer to vitamins (A, B1, B2, B6, C, D, E, K), beta-carotene, amino acids (lysine, isoleucine, leucine, threonine, valine, tryptophan, phenylalanine, and methionine), minerals (iodine, calcium, iron, zinc, copper, selenium, magnesium, potassium, manganese), herbal compounds (including ginsenosides, Pycnogenol, resveratrol, epigallocatechin, curcumin), and drugs (such as ampicillin, carbamazepine, chlorzoxazone, diclofenac, fexofenadine, ibuprofen, rifampicin, tetracycline, pyrazinamide).

Allicin from garlic enhances the effect of the fungicide amphotericin B on pathogenic fungi such as yeast cells by affecting the transport of the fungicide into the yeast vacuole.

Curcumin which inter alia is found in curry inhibits like piperine the enzyme CYP3A4 and affects the transport function of P-glycoprotein. In combination with curcumin an increased bioavailability of the active compounds celiprolol and midazolam was detected.

Ginger promotes due to the gingerols the intestinal absorption of many compounds (including drugs) and elements. In most cases, ginger acts synergistically with piperine.

Glycyrrhizin, a saponin of the liquorice plant, promotes the action of numerous antibiotics and the antifungal agent clotrimazole.

Quercetin, a flavonoid from fruits and leaves, acts like curcumin and piperine. It increases the bioavailability of the active agent paclitaxel used to treat cancer.

Carum carvi, a herb from Apiaceae enhances the bioavailability of anti tuberculosis drugs such as rifampicin, isoniazid, and pyrazinamide.

== Application of research results ==
The bioenhancer technology is primarily targeted for toxic drugs, expensive drugs, scarce drugs, poorly bioavailable drugs or drugs which need to be given for prolonged periods. However it can also be used in any drugs influenced by bioenhancers. The discovery and characterization of bioenhancers has led to several patent applications. Piperine is marketed as bioenhancer in mono preparations and as a component of dietary supplements that contain different vitamins, curcumin, resveratrol or Coenzyme Q_{10}.

Since bioenhancers can reduce the dosage and cost of expensive medication while making treatment safer, its application has for the first time been done in humans in treating tuberculosis for which the existing drugs are toxic and expensive and need to be administered over prolonged periods. In India where low treatment costs for medical care are essential, the drug Risorine is approved against tuberculosis. Besides the antibiotics rifampicin and isoniazid it contains piperine.

== See also ==
- Antinutrient
