= Sand Point, Nova Scotia =

Sand Point, Nova Scotia may refer to one of two places:

- Sand Point, Colchester County
- Sand Point, Guysborough County
