= TNP2 =

Protein-coding gene in the species Homo sapiens

Identifiers
- Aliases: TNP2, TP2, transition protein 2 (during histone to protamine replacement), transition protein 2
- External IDs: OMIM: 190232; MGI: 98785; GeneCards: TNP2

Gene location (Human)
Chr.	Chromosome 16 (human)
Band	16p13.13	Start	11,267,748 bp
Band	16p13.13	End	11,269,533 bp

Gene location (Mouse)
Chr.	Chromosome 16 (mouse)
Band	16 A1|16 5.83 cM	Start	10,605,800 bp
Band	16 A1|16 5.83 cM	End	10,606,524 bp
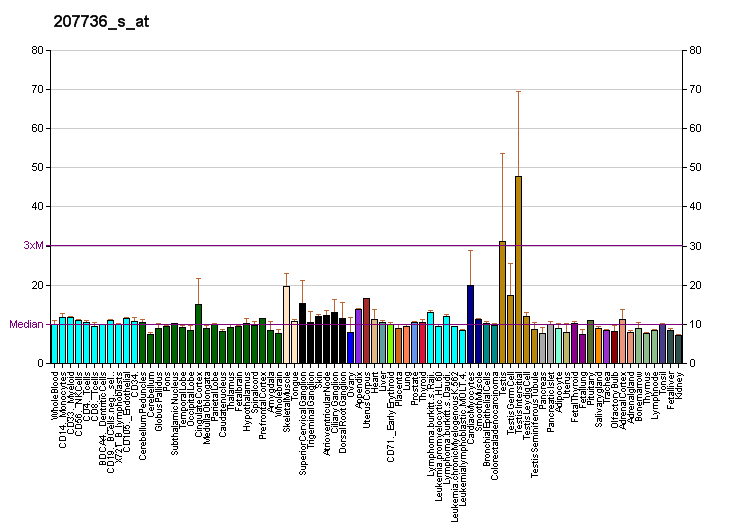

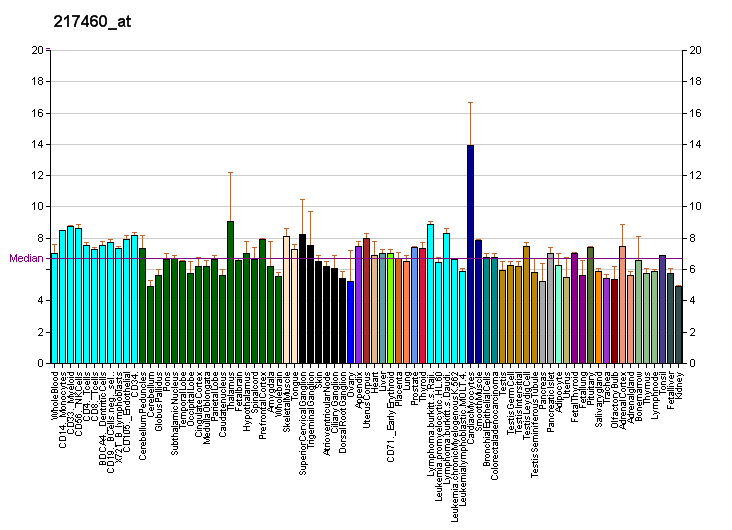
RNA expression pattern
Bgee	Human / Mouse (ortholog); Top expressed in: sperm; left testis; testicle; right testis; gonad; right coronary artery; human musculoskeletal system; muscular system; muscle; muscle / Top expressed in: seminiferous tubule; spermatid; spermatocyte; embryo; morula; morula; blastocyst; skeletal muscle tissue; central gray substance of midbrain; nucleus of stria terminalis; More reference expression data
BioGPS	More reference expression data
Gene ontology
Molecular function	DNA binding; metal ion binding; zinc ion binding
Cellular component	male germ cell nucleus; nucleosome; nucleus; chromosome
Biological process	multicellular organism development; cell differentiation; spermatogenesis; acrosome reaction; penetration of zona pellucida; positive regulation of protein processing
Sources:Amigo / QuickGO
Orthologs
Databases	NCBI: entry; OMA: entry
Species	Human	Mouse
Entrez	7142	21959
Ensembl	ENSG00000178279	ENSMUSG00000043050
UniProt	Q05952	P11378
RefSeq (mRNA)	NM_005425	NM_013694
RefSeq (protein)	NP_005416	NP_038722
Location (UCSC)	Chr 16: 11.27 – 11.27 Mb	Chr 16: 10.61 – 10.61 Mb
PubMed search
- Wikidata
View/Edit Human	View/Edit Mouse

Nuclear transition protein 2 is a protein that in humans is encoded by the TNP2 gene.
