= Vacuolar fusion protein Mon1 =

Membrane protein

SAND protein family, first described in Saccharomyces cerevisiae (but also in the animals Fugu rubripes, Caenorhabditis elegans, Drosophila melanogaster and Homo sapiens and in the plant Arabidopsis thaliana using comparative genomics), is membrane protein related with vesicle traffic: vacuole fusion in yeasts and lysosome one motility in mammals and other taxa. In humans has been described an interaction with HSV-1, a virus which produces Herpes simplex.

== See also ==
- SNARE (protein)
