= Virosome =

Drug or vaccine delivery mechanism

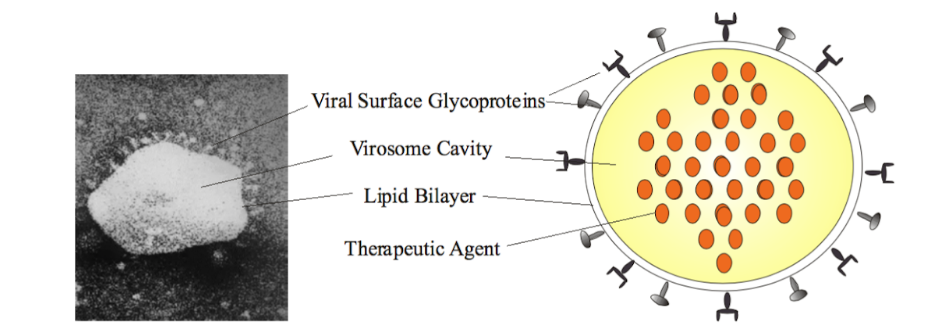
Components of a Virosome

A virosome is a drug or vaccine delivery mechanism consisting of unilamellar phospholipid membrane (either a mono- or bi-layer) vesicle incorporating virus-derived proteins to allow the virosomes to fuse with target cells. Viruses are infectious agents that can replicate in their host organism, however virosomes do not replicate. The properties that virosomes share with viruses are based on their structure; virosomes are essentially safely modified viral envelopes that contain the phospholipid membrane and surface glycoproteins. As a drug or vaccine delivery mechanism they are biologically compatible with many host organisms and are also biodegradable. The use of reconstituted virally derived proteins in the formation of the virosome allows for the utilization of what would otherwise be the immunogenic properties of a live-attenuated virus, but is instead a safely killed virus. A safely killed virus can serve as a promising vector because it won't cause infection and the viral structure allows the virosome to recognize specific components of its target cells.

== Virosomes structure ==
Virosomes are vehicles that have a spherical shape with a phospholipid mono/bilayer membrane. Inside of the virosome, there is a central cavity that holds the therapeutic molecules such as nucleic acids, proteins, and drugs. On the surface of the virosome, there can be different types of glycoproteins. Glycoproteins are a type of protein that have an oligosaccharide chain bonded to amino acid chains. The different types of glycoproteins on the surface of the virosome increases the specificity of the target cells because the surface glycoproteins help with recognition as well as the attachments of the virosomes to their target cells. In the case of the influenza virosome, the glycoproteins are antigen, haemagglutinin, and neuraminidase. Antigens are molecules that triggers an immune response when targeted by a specific antibody that corresponds to the shape of the antigen. Haemagglutinin is a viral glycoprotein that causes red blood cell agglutination. Neuraminidase are enzymes that break glycosidic linkages. The size and surface molecules presented on of the virosome can be modified so that it can target different types of cells.

== Virosome applications ==
Virosomes deliver antigens and therapeutic agents to their targeted cells. Virosomes can act as immunopotentiating agents and as agents of targeted drug delivery. Virosomes as immunopotentiating agents activate cell mediated and humoral immune responses. Virosomes are suspended in saline buffers and are administered through respiratory, parenteral, intravenous, oral, intramuscular, and topical routes.

== Influenza virosomes ==
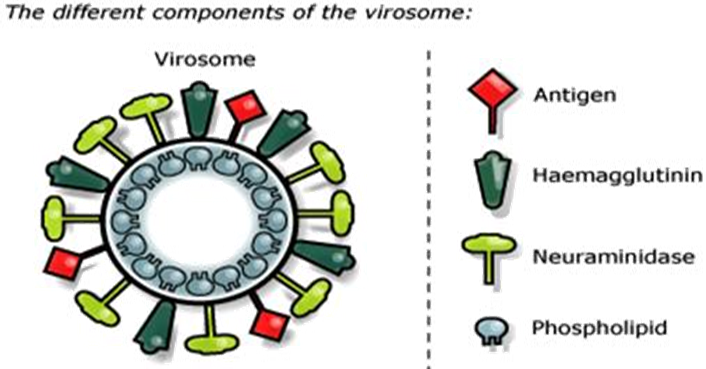
Components of an influenza virosome

In contrast to liposomes, virosomes contain functional viral envelope glycoproteins: influenza virus hemagglutinin (HA) and neuraminidase (NA) intercalated in the phospholipid bilayer membrane. They have a typical mean diameter of 150 nm. Essentially, virosomes represent reconstituted empty influenza virus envelopes, devoid of the nucleocapsid including the genetic material of the source virus.

== Non-influenza virosomes ==
They are also being considered for HIV-1 vaccine research.

They were used as a drug carrier mechanism for experimental cancer therapies.

== Benefits and challenges ==
The benefits of virosomes are that the specific structure and small size help with the precision of target cells. The phospholipid membrane protects the virosome from adverse reactions in the body and the membrane allows the virosome to be biocompatible and biodegradable in the body. The challenges of virosomes are the rapid detection and activation of the immune response against the viral glycoproteins, which can result in a decrease of the virosomes. However, glycoproteins can still induce a prophylactic response against the virus, which helps with establishing virosomes as vaccine delivery systems. If the virosome is administered into the bloodstream, the virosome can disintegrate. However, if the virosome can reach the target quickly enough, the drug delivery will still happen. There are some challenges with virosomes, but there are ways in which the virosome can still help activate the immune response.
