= Sanda Church =

- Sanda kyrka
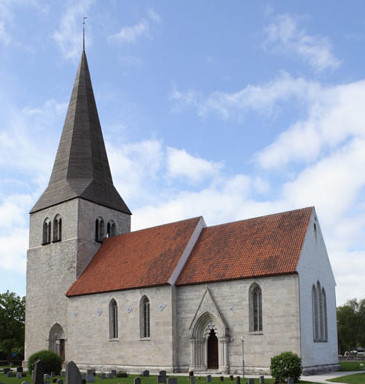
- Sanda Church, view of the exterior

- Location within Gotland
- 57°25′45″N 18°13′24″E
- Country: Sweden
- Denomination: Church of Sweden

Administration
- Diocese: Visby

Sanda Church (Swedish: Sanda kyrka) is a medieval church on the island of Gotland, Sweden. Its oldest parts date from the middle of the 13th century. It belongs to the Diocese of Visby.

== History and architecture ==
The oldest part of the church is the tower, dating from the middle of the 13th century. The nave is from the beginning of the 14th century, while the choir dates from the middle of the same century. There was an earlier church on the same spot, elements of which have been incorporated as building material in the presently visible church. The church is richly decorated inside with murals dating from the Middle Ages. They depict different Christian motifs.

Of the church fittings, the baptismal font (second half of 12th century) and triumphal cross (middle of the 13th century) are both medieval. The church was renovated in 1956. Several runic inscriptions were also discovered in or around the church, with one of the grave-slabs being displayed in the Swedish History Museum in Stockholm.
