= List of MeSH codes (D27) =

The following is a partial list of the "D" codes for Medical Subject Headings (MeSH), as defined by the United States National Library of Medicine (NLM).

This list continues the information at List of MeSH codes (D26). Codes following these are found at List of MeSH codes (E01). For other MeSH codes, see List of MeSH codes.

The source for this content is the MeSH Browser from the NLM.

== MeSH D27 – chemical actions and uses ==
=== MeSH D27.505 – pharmacologic actions ===
==== MeSH D27.505.259 – diagnostic uses of chemicals ====
- MeSH D27.505.259.500 – contrast media
- MeSH D27.505.259.750 – molecular probes
- MeSH D27.505.259.750.300 – fluorescent chemosensor compounds
- MeSH D27.505.259.750.600 – nucleic acid probes
- MeSH D27.505.259.750.600.223 – DNA probes
- MeSH D27.505.259.750.600.223.615 – DNA probes, hla
- MeSH D27.505.259.750.600.223.620 – DNA probes, hpv
- MeSH D27.505.259.750.600.650 – oligonucleotide probes
- MeSH D27.505.259.750.600.825 – rna probes
- MeSH D27.505.259.812 – neuronal tract-tracers
- MeSH D27.505.259.843 – radiopharmaceuticals
- MeSH D27.505.259.875 – reagent kits, diagnostic
- MeSH D27.505.259.875.680 – reagent strips

==== MeSH D27.505.389 – metabolic side effects of drugs and substances ====
- MeSH D27.505.389.249 – cytochrome p-450 enzyme inducers
- MeSH D27.505.389.249.120 – cytochrome p-450 cyp1a2 inducers
- MeSH D27.505.389.249.260 – cytochrome p-450 cyp2b6 inducers
- MeSH D27.505.389.249.308 – cytochrome p-450 cyp2c8 inducers
- MeSH D27.505.389.249.320 – cytochrome p-450 cyp2c9 inducers
- MeSH D27.505.389.249.350 – cytochrome p-450 cyp2c19 inducers
- MeSH D27.505.389.249.500 – cytochrome p-450 cyp2d6 inducers
- MeSH D27.505.389.249.600 – cytochrome p-450 cyp2e1 inducers
- MeSH D27.505.389.249.700 – cytochrome p-450 cyp3a inducers
- MeSH D27.505.389.500 – cytochrome p-450 enzyme inhibitors
- MeSH D27.505.389.500.059 – 14-alpha demethylase inhibitors
- MeSH D27.505.389.500.120 – cytochrome p-450 cyp1a2 inhibitors
- MeSH D27.505.389.500.260 – cytochrome p-450 cyp2b6 inhibitors
- MeSH D27.505.389.500.308 – cytochrome p-450 cyp2c8 inhibitors
- MeSH D27.505.389.500.315 – cytochrome p-450 cyp2c9 inhibitors
- MeSH D27.505.389.500.319 – cytochrome p-450 cyp2c19 inhibitors
- MeSH D27.505.389.500.368 – cytochrome p-450 cyp2d6 inhibitors
- MeSH D27.505.389.500.421 – cytochrome p-450 cyp2e1 inhibitors
- MeSH D27.505.389.500.503 – cytochrome p-450 cyp3a inhibitors

==== MeSH D27.505.519 – molecular mechanisms of pharmacological action ====
- MeSH D27.505.519.124 – alkylating agents
- MeSH D27.505.519.124.035 – antineoplastic agents, alkylating
- MeSH D27.505.519.143 – amylin receptor agonists
- MeSH D27.505.519.162 – angiotensin receptor antagonists
- MeSH D27.505.519.162.500 – angiotensin ii type 1 receptor blockers
- MeSH D27.505.519.162.750 – angiotensin ii type 2 receptor blockers
- MeSH D27.505.519.170 – antacids
- MeSH D27.505.519.174 – antidiuretic hormone receptor antagonists
- MeSH D27.505.519.178 – antifoaming agents
- MeSH D27.505.519.182 – antiglycation agents
- MeSH D27.505.519.186 – antimetabolites
- MeSH D27.505.519.186.071 – hypolipidemic agents
- MeSH D27.505.519.186.071.202 – anticholesteremic agents
- MeSH D27.505.519.186.071.202.370 – hydroxymethylglutaryl-coa reductase inhibitors
- MeSH D27.505.519.186.071.202.685 – pcsk9 inhibitors
- MeSH D27.505.519.186.071.401 – fatty acid synthesis inhibitors
- MeSH D27.505.519.186.071.601 – lipotropic agents
- MeSH D27.505.519.186.144 – antimetabolites, antineoplastic
- MeSH D27.505.519.217 – antioxidants
- MeSH D27.505.519.217.500 – free radical scavengers
- MeSH D27.505.519.241 – aversive agents
- MeSH D27.505.519.265 – bradykinin receptor antagonists
- MeSH D27.505.519.265.249 – bradykinin b1 receptor antagonists
- MeSH D27.505.519.265.500 – bradykinin b2 receptor antagonists
- MeSH D27.505.519.270 – calcitonin gene-related peptide receptor antagonists
- MeSH D27.505.519.275 – ccr5 receptor antagonists
- MeSH D27.505.519.295 – cerumenolytic agents
- MeSH D27.505.519.334 – cystine depleting agents
- MeSH D27.505.519.349 – cytochrome p-450 enzyme inducers
- MeSH D27.505.519.349.120 – cytochrome p-450 cyp1a2 inducers
- MeSH D27.505.519.349.260 – cytochrome p-450 cyp2b6 inducers
- MeSH D27.505.519.349.308 – cytochrome p-450 cyp2c8 inducers
- MeSH D27.505.519.349.320 – cytochrome p-450 cyp2c9 inducers
- MeSH D27.505.519.349.350 – cytochrome p-450 cyp2c19 inducers
- MeSH D27.505.519.349.500 – cytochrome p-450 cyp2d6 inducers
- MeSH D27.505.519.349.600 – cytochrome p-450 cyp2e1 inducers
- MeSH D27.505.519.349.700 – cytochrome p-450 cyp3a inducers
- MeSH D27.505.519.364 – endothelin receptor antagonists
- MeSH D27.505.519.364.500 – endothelin a receptor antagonists
- MeSH D27.505.519.364.750 – endothelin b receptor antagonists
- MeSH D27.505.519.374 – enzyme activators
- MeSH D27.505.519.374.099 – carbamoyl phosphate synthetase i activators
- MeSH D27.505.519.374.200 – gtp phosphohydrolase activators
- MeSH D27.505.519.374.400 – guanylyl cyclase c agonists
- MeSH D27.505.519.374.600 – lipoprotein lipase activators
- MeSH D27.505.519.389 – enzyme inhibitors
- MeSH D27.505.519.389.086 – 5-lipoxygenase-activating protein inhibitors
- MeSH D27.505.519.389.089 – acetaldehyde dehydrogenase inhibitors
- MeSH D27.505.519.389.092 – adenosine deaminase inhibitors
- MeSH D27.505.519.389.108 – adenylyl cyclase inhibitors
- MeSH D27.505.519.389.124 – aromatic amino acid decarboxylase inhibitors
- MeSH D27.505.519.389.174 – calcineurin inhibitors
- MeSH D27.505.519.389.200 – carbonic anhydrase inhibitors
- MeSH D27.505.519.389.237 – catechol o-methyltransferase inhibitors
- MeSH D27.505.519.389.275 – cholinesterase inhibitors
- MeSH D27.505.519.389.310 – cyclooxygenase inhibitors
- MeSH D27.505.519.389.310.500 – cyclooxygenase 2 inhibitors
- MeSH D27.505.519.389.315 – gamma secretase inhibitors and modulators
- MeSH D27.505.519.389.320 – glycoside hydrolase inhibitors
- MeSH D27.505.519.389.335 – cytochrome p-450 enzyme inhibitors
- MeSH D27.505.519.389.335.059 – 14-alpha demethylase inhibitors
- MeSH D27.505.519.389.335.120 – cytochrome p-450 cyp1a2 inhibitors
- MeSH D27.505.519.389.335.260 – cytochrome p-450 cyp2b6 inhibitors
- MeSH D27.505.519.389.335.308 – cytochrome p-450 cyp2c8 inhibitors
- MeSH D27.505.519.389.335.319 – cytochrome p-450 cyp2c19 inhibitors
- MeSH D27.505.519.389.335.329 – cytochrome p-450 cyp2c9 inhibitors
- MeSH D27.505.519.389.335.368 – cytochrome p-450 cyp2d6 inhibitors
- MeSH D27.505.519.389.335.421 – cytochrome p-450 cyp2e1 inhibitors
- MeSH D27.505.519.389.335.503 – cytochrome p-450 cyp3a inhibitors
- MeSH D27.505.519.389.350 – folic acid antagonists
- MeSH D27.505.519.389.360 – histone deacetylase inhibitors
- MeSH D27.505.519.389.370 – hydroxymethylglutaryl-coa reductase inhibitors
- MeSH D27.505.519.389.375 – integrase inhibitors
- MeSH D27.505.519.389.375.400 – hiv integrase inhibitors
- MeSH D27.505.519.389.400 – beta-lactamase inhibitors
- MeSH D27.505.519.389.480 – lipoxygenase inhibitors
- MeSH D27.505.519.389.616 – monoamine oxidase inhibitors
- MeSH D27.505.519.389.675 – nucleic acid synthesis inhibitors
- MeSH D27.505.519.389.675.850 – reverse transcriptase inhibitors
- MeSH D27.505.519.389.705 – ornithine decarboxylase inhibitors
- MeSH D27.505.519.389.735 – phosphodiesterase inhibitors
- MeSH D27.505.519.389.735.249 – phosphodiesterase 3 inhibitors
- MeSH D27.505.519.389.735.374 – phosphodiesterase 4 inhibitors
- MeSH D27.505.519.389.735.500 – phosphodiesterase 5 inhibitors
- MeSH D27.505.519.389.736 – phosphoinositide-3 kinase inhibitors
- MeSH D27.505.519.389.737 – phospholipase a2 inhibitors
- MeSH D27.505.519.389.739 – poly(adp-ribose) polymerase inhibitors
- MeSH D27.505.519.389.740 – prolyl-hydroxylase inhibitors
- MeSH D27.505.519.389.745 – protease inhibitors
- MeSH D27.505.519.389.745.085 – angiotensin-converting enzyme inhibitors
- MeSH D27.505.519.389.745.085.500 – vasopeptidase inhibitors
- MeSH D27.505.519.389.745.325 – cysteine proteinase inhibitors
- MeSH D27.505.519.389.745.325.500 – caspase inhibitors
- MeSH D27.505.519.389.745.335 – dipeptidyl-peptidase iv inhibitors
- MeSH D27.505.519.389.745.610 – matrix metalloproteinase inhibitors
- MeSH D27.505.519.389.745.705 – proteasome inhibitors
- MeSH D27.505.519.389.745.753 – renin inhibitors
- MeSH D27.505.519.389.745.800 – serine proteinase inhibitors
- MeSH D27.505.519.389.745.800.449 – antithrombins
- MeSH D27.505.519.389.745.800.449.500 – factor xa inhibitors
- MeSH D27.505.519.389.745.800.506 – pcsk9 inhibitors
- MeSH D27.505.519.389.745.800.562 – serine peptidase inhibitors, kazal type
- MeSH D27.505.519.389.745.800.675 – serpins
- MeSH D27.505.519.389.745.800.900 – trypsin inhibitors
- MeSH D27.505.519.389.745.900 – viral protease inhibitors
- MeSH D27.505.519.389.745.900.250 – coronavirus protease inhibitors
- MeSH D27.505.519.389.745.900.375 – hcv ns3-4a protease inhibitors
- MeSH D27.505.519.389.745.900.500 – hiv protease inhibitors
- MeSH D27.505.519.389.755 – protein kinase inhibitors
- MeSH D27.505.519.389.755.500 – janus kinase inhibitors
- MeSH D27.505.519.389.755.750 – mtor inhibitors
- MeSH D27.505.519.389.755.875 – tyrosine kinase inhibitors
- MeSH D27.505.519.389.760 – protein synthesis inhibitors
- MeSH D27.505.519.389.848 – proton pump inhibitors
- MeSH D27.505.519.389.870 – steroid synthesis inhibitors
- MeSH D27.505.519.389.870.100 – 14-alpha demethylase inhibitors
- MeSH D27.505.519.389.870.200 – 5-alpha reductase inhibitors
- MeSH D27.505.519.389.870.300 – aromatase inhibitors
- MeSH D27.505.519.389.892 – topoisomerase inhibitors
- MeSH D27.505.519.389.892.500 – topoisomerase i inhibitors
- MeSH D27.505.519.389.892.750 – topoisomerase ii inhibitors
- MeSH D27.505.519.389.936 – uncoupling agents
- MeSH D27.505.519.389.936.500 – proton ionophores
- MeSH D27.505.519.405 – enzyme reactivators
- MeSH D27.505.519.405.347 – cholinesterase reactivators
- MeSH D27.505.519.421 – fibrin modulating agents
- MeSH D27.505.519.421.500 – antifibrinolytic agents
- MeSH D27.505.519.421.750 – fibrinolytic agents
- MeSH D27.505.519.452 – heparin antagonists
- MeSH D27.505.519.507 – immune checkpoint inhibitors
- MeSH D27.505.519.562 – membrane transport modulators
- MeSH D27.505.519.562.061 – acetylcholine release inhibitors
- MeSH D27.505.519.562.124 – calcium channel agonists
- MeSH D27.505.519.562.249 – calcium channel blockers
- MeSH D27.505.519.562.311 – chloride channel agonists
- MeSH D27.505.519.562.374 – ionophores
- MeSH D27.505.519.562.374.100 – calcium ionophores
- MeSH D27.505.519.562.374.400 – potassium ionophores
- MeSH D27.505.519.562.374.500 – proton ionophores
- MeSH D27.505.519.562.374.750 – sodium ionophores
- MeSH D27.505.519.562.437 – neurotransmitter uptake inhibitors
- MeSH D27.505.519.562.437.050 – adrenergic uptake inhibitors
- MeSH D27.505.519.562.437.220 – dopamine uptake inhibitors
- MeSH D27.505.519.562.437.535 – gaba uptake inhibitors
- MeSH D27.505.519.562.437.693 – serotonin and noradrenaline reuptake inhibitors
- MeSH D27.505.519.562.437.850 – selective serotonin reuptake inhibitors
- MeSH D27.505.519.562.500 – potassium channel blockers
- MeSH D27.505.519.562.625 – sodium channel agonists
- MeSH D27.505.519.562.625.249 – epithelial sodium channel agonists
- MeSH D27.505.519.562.625.500 – voltage-gated sodium channel agonists
- MeSH D27.505.519.562.750 – sodium channel blockers
- MeSH D27.505.519.562.750.100 – acid sensing ion channel blockers
- MeSH D27.505.519.562.750.374 – epithelial sodium channel blockers
- MeSH D27.505.519.562.750.500 – voltage-gated sodium channel blockers
- MeSH D27.505.519.562.812 – sodium chloride symporter inhibitors
- MeSH D27.505.519.562.906 – sodium potassium chloride symporter inhibitors
- MeSH D27.505.519.593 – mitosis modulators
- MeSH D27.505.519.593.249 – antimitotic agents
- MeSH D27.505.519.593.249.500 – tubulin modulators
- MeSH D27.505.519.593.624 – mitogens
- MeSH D27.505.519.625 – neurotransmitter agents
- MeSH D27.505.519.625.050 – adrenergic agents
- MeSH D27.505.519.625.050.100 – adrenergic agonists
- MeSH D27.505.519.625.050.100.100 – adrenergic alpha-agonists
- MeSH D27.505.519.625.050.100.100.100 – adrenergic alpha-1 receptor agonists
- MeSH D27.505.519.625.050.100.100.200 – adrenergic alpha-2 receptor agonists
- MeSH D27.505.519.625.050.100.200 – adrenergic beta-agonists
- MeSH D27.505.519.625.050.100.200.100 – adrenergic beta-1 receptor agonists
- MeSH D27.505.519.625.050.100.200.200 – adrenergic beta-2 receptor agonists
- MeSH D27.505.519.625.050.100.200.300 – adrenergic beta-3 receptor agonists
- MeSH D27.505.519.625.050.200 – adrenergic antagonists
- MeSH D27.505.519.625.050.200.100 – adrenergic alpha-antagonists
- MeSH D27.505.519.625.050.200.100.100 – adrenergic alpha-1 receptor antagonists
- MeSH D27.505.519.625.050.200.100.200 – adrenergic alpha-2 receptor antagonists
- MeSH D27.505.519.625.050.200.200 – adrenergic beta-antagonists
- MeSH D27.505.519.625.050.200.200.100 – adrenergic beta-1 receptor antagonists
- MeSH D27.505.519.625.050.200.200.200 – adrenergic beta-2 receptor antagonists
- MeSH D27.505.519.625.050.200.200.300 – adrenergic beta-3 receptor antagonists
- MeSH D27.505.519.625.050.601 – adrenergic uptake inhibitors
- MeSH D27.505.519.625.085 – cannabinoid receptor modulators
- MeSH D27.505.519.625.085.500 – cannabinoid receptor agonists
- MeSH D27.505.519.625.085.750 – cannabinoid receptor antagonists
- MeSH D27.505.519.625.120 – cholinergic agents
- MeSH D27.505.519.625.120.069 – acetylcholine release inhibitors
- MeSH D27.505.519.625.120.140 – cholinergic agonists
- MeSH D27.505.519.625.120.140.500 – muscarinic agonists
- MeSH D27.505.519.625.120.140.700 – nicotinic agonists
- MeSH D27.505.519.625.120.200 – cholinergic antagonists
- MeSH D27.505.519.625.120.200.500 – muscarinic antagonists
- MeSH D27.505.519.625.120.200.700 – nicotinic antagonists
- MeSH D27.505.519.625.120.300 – cholinesterase inhibitors
- MeSH D27.505.519.625.120.400 – cholinesterase reactivators
- MeSH D27.505.519.625.150 – dopamine agents
- MeSH D27.505.519.625.150.151 – dopamine agonists
- MeSH D27.505.519.625.150.175 – dopamine antagonists
- MeSH D27.505.519.625.150.175.500 – dopamine d2 receptor antagonists
- MeSH D27.505.519.625.150.800 – dopamine uptake inhibitors
- MeSH D27.505.519.625.190 – excitatory amino acid agents
- MeSH D27.505.519.625.190.200 – excitatory amino acid agonists
- MeSH D27.505.519.625.190.300 – excitatory amino acid antagonists
- MeSH D27.505.519.625.240 – gaba agents
- MeSH D27.505.519.625.240.200 – gaba agonists
- MeSH D27.505.519.625.240.200.500 – gaba-a receptor agonists
- MeSH D27.505.519.625.240.200.750 – gaba-b receptor agonists
- MeSH D27.505.519.625.240.300 – gaba antagonists
- MeSH D27.505.519.625.240.300.500 – gaba-a receptor antagonists
- MeSH D27.505.519.625.240.300.750 – gaba-b receptor antagonists
- MeSH D27.505.519.625.240.500 – gaba modulators
- MeSH D27.505.519.625.240.750 – gaba uptake inhibitors
- MeSH D27.505.519.625.270 – gasotransmitters
- MeSH D27.505.519.625.300 – glycine agents
- MeSH D27.505.519.625.375 – histamine agents
- MeSH D27.505.519.625.375.400 – histamine agonists
- MeSH D27.505.519.625.375.425 – histamine antagonists
- MeSH D27.505.519.625.375.425.400 – histamine h1 antagonists
- MeSH D27.505.519.625.375.425.400.500 – histamine h1 antagonists, non-sedating
- MeSH D27.505.519.625.375.425.425 – histamine h2 antagonists
- MeSH D27.505.519.625.375.425.712 – histamine h3 antagonists
- MeSH D27.505.519.625.487 – neurokinin-1 receptor antagonists
- MeSH D27.505.519.625.544 – neurosteroids
- MeSH D27.505.519.625.600 – neurotransmitter uptake inhibitors
- MeSH D27.505.519.625.600.050 – adrenergic uptake inhibitors
- MeSH D27.505.519.625.600.220 – dopamine uptake inhibitors
- MeSH D27.505.519.625.600.535 – gaba uptake inhibitors
- MeSH D27.505.519.625.600.693 – serotonin and noradrenaline reuptake inhibitors
- MeSH D27.505.519.625.600.850 – selective serotonin reuptake inhibitors
- MeSH D27.505.519.625.663 – orexin receptor antagonists
- MeSH D27.505.519.625.725 – purinergic agents
- MeSH D27.505.519.625.725.200 – purinergic agonists
- MeSH D27.505.519.625.725.200.100 – purinergic p1 receptor agonists
- MeSH D27.505.519.625.725.200.100.100 – adenosine a1 receptor agonists
- MeSH D27.505.519.625.725.200.100.200 – adenosine a2 receptor agonists
- MeSH D27.505.519.625.725.200.100.300 – adenosine a3 receptor agonists
- MeSH D27.505.519.625.725.200.200 – purinergic p2 receptor agonists
- MeSH D27.505.519.625.725.200.200.100 – purinergic p2x receptor agonists
- MeSH D27.505.519.625.725.200.200.200 – purinergic p2y receptor agonists
- MeSH D27.505.519.625.725.400 – purinergic antagonists
- MeSH D27.505.519.625.725.400.100 – purinergic p1 receptor antagonists
- MeSH D27.505.519.625.725.400.100.100 – adenosine a1 receptor antagonists
- MeSH D27.505.519.625.725.400.100.200 – adenosine a2 receptor antagonists
- MeSH D27.505.519.625.725.400.100.300 – adenosine a3 receptor antagonists
- MeSH D27.505.519.625.725.400.200 – purinergic p2 receptor antagonists
- MeSH D27.505.519.625.725.400.200.100 – purinergic p2x receptor antagonists
- MeSH D27.505.519.625.725.400.200.200 – purinergic p2y receptor antagonists
- MeSH D27.505.519.625.850 – serotonin agents
- MeSH D27.505.519.625.850.800 – serotonin receptor agonists
- MeSH D27.505.519.625.850.800.100 – serotonin 5-ht1 receptor agonists
- MeSH D27.505.519.625.850.800.200 – serotonin 5-ht2 receptor agonists
- MeSH D27.505.519.625.850.800.300 – serotonin 5-ht3 receptor agonists
- MeSH D27.505.519.625.850.800.400 – serotonin 5-ht4 receptor agonists
- MeSH D27.505.519.625.850.850 – serotonin antagonists
- MeSH D27.505.519.625.850.850.100 – serotonin 5-ht1 receptor antagonists
- MeSH D27.505.519.625.850.850.200 – serotonin 5-ht2 receptor antagonists
- MeSH D27.505.519.625.850.850.300 – serotonin 5-ht3 receptor antagonists
- MeSH D27.505.519.625.850.850.400 – serotonin 5-ht4 receptor antagonists
- MeSH D27.505.519.625.850.900 – selective serotonin reuptake inhibitors
- MeSH D27.505.519.656 – nitric oxide donors
- MeSH D27.505.519.828 – peptidomimetics
- MeSH D27.505.519.871 – radiopharmaceuticals
- MeSH D27.505.519.914 – sequestering agents
- MeSH D27.505.519.914.500 – chelating agents
- MeSH D27.505.519.914.500.204 – calcium chelating agents
- MeSH D27.505.519.914.500.410 – iron chelating agents
- MeSH D27.505.519.914.500.410.750 – siderophores
- MeSH D27.505.519.936 – sodium-glucose transporter 2 inhibitors
- MeSH D27.505.519.947 – sphingosine 1 phosphate receptor modulators
- MeSH D27.505.519.952 – toll-like receptor agonists
- MeSH D27.505.519.957 – viral fusion protein inhibitors
- MeSH D27.505.519.957.500 – hiv fusion inhibitors

==== MeSH D27.505.696 – physiological effects of drugs ====
- MeSH D27.505.696.034 – abuse-deterrent formulations
- MeSH D27.505.696.034.500 – aversive agents
- MeSH D27.505.696.068 – antipyretics
- MeSH D27.505.696.138 – antispermatogenic agents
- MeSH D27.505.696.138.379 – sperm immobilizing agents
- MeSH D27.505.696.138.569 – spermatocidal agents
- MeSH D27.505.696.138.760 – spermatogenesis-blocking agents
- MeSH D27.505.696.207 – astringents
- MeSH D27.505.696.242 – bone density conservation agents
- MeSH D27.505.696.260 – calcium-regulating hormones and agents
- MeSH D27.505.696.260.250 – calcium channel agonists
- MeSH D27.505.696.260.500 – calcium channel blockers
- MeSH D27.505.696.277 – central nervous system depressants
- MeSH D27.505.696.277.100 – anesthetics
- MeSH D27.505.696.277.100.017 – anesthetics, combined
- MeSH D27.505.696.277.100.035 – anesthetics, general
- MeSH D27.505.696.277.100.035.060 – anesthetics, inhalation
- MeSH D27.505.696.277.100.035.075 – anesthetics, intravenous
- MeSH D27.505.696.277.100.035.075.035 – anesthetics, dissociative
- MeSH D27.505.696.277.100.200 – anesthetics, local
- MeSH D27.505.696.277.350 – hypnotics and sedatives
- MeSH D27.505.696.277.350.500 – sleep aids, pharmaceutical
- MeSH D27.505.696.277.350.500.500 – orexin receptor antagonists
- MeSH D27.505.696.277.600 – narcotics
- MeSH D27.505.696.277.600.500 – analgesics, opioid
- MeSH D27.505.696.277.950 – tranquilizing agents
- MeSH D27.505.696.277.950.015 – anti-anxiety agents
- MeSH D27.505.696.277.950.025 – antimanic agents
- MeSH D27.505.696.277.950.040 – antipsychotic agents
- MeSH D27.505.696.282 – central nervous system stimulants
- MeSH D27.505.696.282.045 – aphrodisiacs
- MeSH D27.505.696.282.050 – appetite stimulants
- MeSH D27.505.696.282.224 – convulsants
- MeSH D27.505.696.305 – cerumenolytic agents
- MeSH D27.505.696.329 – emetics
- MeSH D27.505.696.353 – endocrine disruptors
- MeSH D27.505.696.365 – galactogogues
- MeSH D27.505.696.377 – growth substances
- MeSH D27.505.696.377.077 – angiogenesis modulating agents
- MeSH D27.505.696.377.077.077 – angiogenesis inducing agents
- MeSH D27.505.696.377.077.099 – angiogenesis inhibitors
- MeSH D27.505.696.377.450 – growth inhibitors
- MeSH D27.505.696.377.450.100 – angiogenesis inhibitors
- MeSH D27.505.696.377.760 – plant growth regulators
- MeSH D27.505.696.388 – hallucinogens
- MeSH D27.505.696.399 – hormones, hormone substitutes, and hormone antagonists
- MeSH D27.505.696.399.450 – hormone antagonists
- MeSH D27.505.696.399.450.065 – androgen antagonists
- MeSH D27.505.696.399.450.065.249 – androgen receptor antagonists
- MeSH D27.505.696.399.450.065.500 – nonsteroidal anti-androgens
- MeSH D27.505.696.399.450.100 – antithyroid agents
- MeSH D27.505.696.399.450.230 – calcimimetic agents
- MeSH D27.505.696.399.450.327 – estrogen antagonists
- MeSH D27.505.696.399.450.327.149 – aromatase inhibitors
- MeSH D27.505.696.399.450.327.650 – estrogen receptor antagonists
- MeSH D27.505.696.399.450.360 – estrogen receptor modulators
- MeSH D27.505.696.399.450.360.827 – selective estrogen receptor modulators
- MeSH D27.505.696.399.450.420 – insulin antagonists
- MeSH D27.505.696.399.450.565 – leukotriene antagonists
- MeSH D27.505.696.399.450.600 – mineralocorticoid receptor antagonists
- MeSH D27.505.696.399.450.710 – prostaglandin antagonists
- MeSH D27.505.696.399.450.783 – puberty inhibitors
- MeSH D27.505.696.399.450.855 – steroid synthesis inhibitors
- MeSH D27.505.696.399.450.855.100 – 14-alpha demethylase inhibitors
- MeSH D27.505.696.399.450.855.200 – 5-alpha reductase inhibitors
- MeSH D27.505.696.399.450.855.300 – aromatase inhibitors
- MeSH D27.505.696.399.472 – hormones
- MeSH D27.505.696.399.472.080 – anabolic agents
- MeSH D27.505.696.399.472.161 – androgens
- MeSH D27.505.696.399.472.188 – cannabinoid receptor modulators
- MeSH D27.505.696.399.472.188.500 – cannabinoid receptor agonists
- MeSH D27.505.696.399.472.188.750 – cannabinoid receptor antagonists
- MeSH D27.505.696.399.472.277 – estrogens
- MeSH D27.505.696.399.472.277.540 – estrogens, non-steroidal
- MeSH D27.505.696.399.472.277.540.500 – phytoestrogens
- MeSH D27.505.696.399.472.488 – glucocorticoids
- MeSH D27.505.696.399.472.580 – incretins
- MeSH D27.505.696.399.472.673 – mineralocorticoids
- MeSH D27.505.696.399.472.858 – progestins
- MeSH D27.505.696.422 – hypoglycemic agents
- MeSH D27.505.696.422.125 – glucagon-like peptide-1 receptor agonists
- MeSH D27.505.696.422.249 – glycoside hydrolase inhibitors
- MeSH D27.505.696.422.374 – amylin receptor agonists
- MeSH D27.505.696.422.500 – dipeptidyl-peptidase iv inhibitors
- MeSH D27.505.696.422.625 – insulin secretagogues
- MeSH D27.505.696.422.688 – ppar-gamma agonists
- MeSH D27.505.696.422.750 – sodium-glucose transporter 2 inhibitors
- MeSH D27.505.696.477 – immunologic factors
- MeSH D27.505.696.477.067 – adjuvants, immunologic
- MeSH D27.505.696.477.067.500 – adjuvants, vaccine
- MeSH D27.505.696.477.136 – agglutinins
- MeSH D27.505.696.477.136.377 – hemagglutinins
- MeSH D27.505.696.477.266 – immunoconjugates
- MeSH D27.505.696.477.266.500 – immunotoxins
- MeSH D27.505.696.477.396 – immunomodulating agents
- MeSH D27.505.696.477.396.500 – toll-like receptor agonists
- MeSH D27.505.696.477.656 – immunosuppressive agents
- MeSH D27.505.696.477.656.500 – complement inactivating agents
- MeSH D27.505.696.477.656.500.500 – bradykinin b2 receptor antagonists
- MeSH D27.505.696.477.656.563 – interleukin inhibitors
- MeSH D27.505.696.477.656.563.001 – interleukin-6 inhibitors
- MeSH D27.505.696.477.656.625 – mtor inhibitors
- MeSH D27.505.696.477.656.750 – myeloablative agonists
- MeSH D27.505.696.477.656.875 – sphingosine 1 phosphate receptor modulators
- MeSH D27.505.696.477.828 – interferon inducers
- MeSH D27.505.696.477.914 – mast cell stabilizers
- MeSH D27.505.696.494 – micronutrients
- MeSH D27.505.696.494.555 – trace elements
- MeSH D27.505.696.494.600 – vitamins
- MeSH D27.505.696.494.600.354 – provitamins
- MeSH D27.505.696.494.600.708 – vitamin b complex
- MeSH D27.505.696.510 – muscle relaxants, central
- MeSH D27.505.696.543 – narcotic antagonists
- MeSH D27.505.696.560 – natriuretic agents
- MeSH D27.505.696.560.249 – antidiuretic agents
- MeSH D27.505.696.560.311 – antidiuretic hormone receptor antagonists
- MeSH D27.505.696.560.374 – antihyperkalemic agents
- MeSH D27.505.696.560.500 – diuretics
- MeSH D27.505.696.560.500.453 – diuretics, osmotic
- MeSH D27.505.696.560.500.726 – diuretics, potassium sparing
- MeSH D27.505.696.560.500.726.100 – epithelial sodium channel blockers
- MeSH D27.505.696.560.500.726.249 – mineralocorticoid receptor antagonists
- MeSH D27.505.696.560.500.863 – sodium chloride symporter inhibitors
- MeSH D27.505.696.560.500.931 – sodium potassium chloride symporter inhibitors
- MeSH D27.505.696.577 – neurotransmitter agents
- MeSH D27.505.696.577.050 – adrenergic agents
- MeSH D27.505.696.577.050.100 – adrenergic agonists
- MeSH D27.505.696.577.050.100.100 – adrenergic alpha-agonists
- MeSH D27.505.696.577.050.100.100.100 – adrenergic alpha-1 receptor agonists
- MeSH D27.505.696.577.050.100.100.200 – adrenergic alpha-2 receptor agonists
- MeSH D27.505.696.577.050.100.200 – adrenergic beta-agonists
- MeSH D27.505.696.577.050.100.200.100 – adrenergic beta-1 receptor agonists
- MeSH D27.505.696.577.050.100.200.200 – adrenergic beta-2 receptor agonists
- MeSH D27.505.696.577.050.100.200.300 – adrenergic beta-3 receptor agonists
- MeSH D27.505.696.577.050.200 – adrenergic antagonists
- MeSH D27.505.696.577.050.200.100 – adrenergic alpha-antagonists
- MeSH D27.505.696.577.050.200.100.100 – adrenergic alpha-1 receptor antagonists
- MeSH D27.505.696.577.050.200.100.200 – adrenergic alpha-2 receptor antagonists
- MeSH D27.505.696.577.050.200.200 – adrenergic beta-antagonists
- MeSH D27.505.696.577.050.200.200.100 – adrenergic beta-1 receptor antagonists
- MeSH D27.505.696.577.050.200.200.200 – adrenergic beta-2 receptor antagonists
- MeSH D27.505.696.577.050.200.200.300 – adrenergic beta-3 receptor antagonists
- MeSH D27.505.696.577.050.601 – adrenergic uptake inhibitors
- MeSH D27.505.696.577.120 – cholinergic agents
- MeSH D27.505.696.577.120.069 – acetylcholine release inhibitors
- MeSH D27.505.696.577.120.140 – cholinergic agonists
- MeSH D27.505.696.577.120.140.500 – muscarinic agonists
- MeSH D27.505.696.577.120.140.700 – nicotinic agonists
- MeSH D27.505.696.577.120.200 – cholinergic antagonists
- MeSH D27.505.696.577.120.200.500 – muscarinic antagonists
- MeSH D27.505.696.577.120.200.700 – nicotinic antagonists
- MeSH D27.505.696.577.120.300 – cholinesterase inhibitors
- MeSH D27.505.696.577.120.400 – cholinesterase reactivators
- MeSH D27.505.696.577.150 – dopamine agents
- MeSH D27.505.696.577.150.151 – dopamine agonists
- MeSH D27.505.696.577.150.175 – dopamine antagonists
- MeSH D27.505.696.577.150.175.500 – dopamine d2 receptor antagonists
- MeSH D27.505.696.577.150.800 – dopamine uptake inhibitors
- MeSH D27.505.696.577.190 – excitatory amino acid agents
- MeSH D27.505.696.577.190.200 – excitatory amino acid agonists
- MeSH D27.505.696.577.190.300 – excitatory amino acid antagonists
- MeSH D27.505.696.577.240 – gaba agents
- MeSH D27.505.696.577.240.200 – gaba agonists
- MeSH D27.505.696.577.240.200.500 – gaba-a receptor agonists
- MeSH D27.505.696.577.240.200.750 – gaba-b receptor agonists
- MeSH D27.505.696.577.240.300 – gaba antagonists
- MeSH D27.505.696.577.240.300.500 – gaba-a receptor antagonists
- MeSH D27.505.696.577.240.300.750 – gaba-b receptor antagonists
- MeSH D27.505.696.577.240.500 – gaba modulators
- MeSH D27.505.696.577.240.750 – gaba uptake inhibitors
- MeSH D27.505.696.577.300 – glycine agents
- MeSH D27.505.696.577.375 – histamine agents
- MeSH D27.505.696.577.375.400 – histamine agonists
- MeSH D27.505.696.577.375.425 – histamine antagonists
- MeSH D27.505.696.577.375.425.400 – histamine h1 antagonists
- MeSH D27.505.696.577.375.425.400.500 – histamine h1 antagonists, non-sedating
- MeSH D27.505.696.577.375.425.425 – histamine h2 antagonists
- MeSH D27.505.696.577.375.425.712 – histamine h3 antagonists
- MeSH D27.505.696.577.487 – neurokinin-1 receptor antagonists
- MeSH D27.505.696.577.544 – neurosteroids
- MeSH D27.505.696.577.600 – neurotransmitter uptake inhibitors
- MeSH D27.505.696.577.600.050 – adrenergic uptake inhibitors
- MeSH D27.505.696.577.600.220 – dopamine uptake inhibitors
- MeSH D27.505.696.577.600.535 – gaba uptake inhibitors
- MeSH D27.505.696.577.600.693 – serotonin and noradrenaline reuptake inhibitors
- MeSH D27.505.696.577.600.850 – selective serotonin reuptake inhibitors
- MeSH D27.505.696.577.663 – orexin receptor antagonists
- MeSH D27.505.696.577.725 – purinergic agents
- MeSH D27.505.696.577.725.200 – purinergic agonists
- MeSH D27.505.696.577.725.200.100 – purinergic p1 receptor agonists
- MeSH D27.505.696.577.725.200.100.100 – adenosine a1 receptor agonists
- MeSH D27.505.696.577.725.200.100.200 – adenosine a2 receptor agonists
- MeSH D27.505.696.577.725.200.100.300 – adenosine a3 receptor agonists
- MeSH D27.505.696.577.725.200.200 – purinergic p2 receptor agonists
- MeSH D27.505.696.577.725.200.200.100 – purinergic p2x receptor agonists
- MeSH D27.505.696.577.725.200.200.200 – purinergic p2y receptor agonists
- MeSH D27.505.696.577.725.400 – purinergic antagonists
- MeSH D27.505.696.577.725.400.100 – purinergic p1 receptor antagonists
- MeSH D27.505.696.577.725.400.100.100 – adenosine a1 receptor antagonists
- MeSH D27.505.696.577.725.400.100.200 – adenosine a2 receptor antagonists
- MeSH D27.505.696.577.725.400.100.300 – adenosine a3 receptor antagonists
- MeSH D27.505.696.577.725.400.200 – purinergic p2 receptor antagonists
- MeSH D27.505.696.577.725.400.200.100 – purinergic p2x receptor antagonists
- MeSH D27.505.696.577.725.400.200.200 – purinergic p2y receptor antagonists
- MeSH D27.505.696.577.850 – serotonin agents
- MeSH D27.505.696.577.850.800 – serotonin receptor agonists
- MeSH D27.505.696.577.850.800.100 – serotonin 5-ht1 receptor agonists
- MeSH D27.505.696.577.850.800.200 – serotonin 5-ht2 receptor agonists
- MeSH D27.505.696.577.850.800.300 – serotonin 5-ht3 receptor agonists
- MeSH D27.505.696.577.850.800.400 – serotonin 5-ht4 receptor agonists
- MeSH D27.505.696.577.850.850 – serotonin antagonists
- MeSH D27.505.696.577.850.850.100 – serotonin 5-ht1 receptor antagonists
- MeSH D27.505.696.577.850.850.200 – serotonin 5-ht2 receptor antagonists
- MeSH D27.505.696.577.850.850.300 – serotonin 5-ht3 receptor antagonists
- MeSH D27.505.696.577.850.850.400 – serotonin 5-ht4 receptor antagonists
- MeSH D27.505.696.577.850.900 – selective serotonin reuptake inhibitors
- MeSH D27.505.696.620 – performance-enhancing substances
- MeSH D27.505.696.663 – peripheral nervous system agents
- MeSH D27.505.696.663.050 – autonomic agents
- MeSH D27.505.696.663.050.030 – antiemetics
- MeSH D27.505.696.663.050.100 – bronchoconstrictor agents
- MeSH D27.505.696.663.050.110 – bronchodilator agents
- MeSH D27.505.696.663.050.225 – emetics
- MeSH D27.505.696.663.050.340 – ganglionic blockers
- MeSH D27.505.696.663.050.400 – ganglionic stimulants
- MeSH D27.505.696.663.050.495 – miotics
- MeSH D27.505.696.663.050.500 – mydriatics
- MeSH D27.505.696.663.050.650 – parasympatholytics
- MeSH D27.505.696.663.050.675 – parasympathomimetics
- MeSH D27.505.696.663.050.850 – sympatholytics
- MeSH D27.505.696.663.050.870 – sympathomimetics
- MeSH D27.505.696.663.700 – neuromuscular agents
- MeSH D27.505.696.663.700.600 – muscle relaxants, central
- MeSH D27.505.696.663.700.710 – neuromuscular blocking agents
- MeSH D27.505.696.663.700.710.550 – neuromuscular depolarizing agents
- MeSH D27.505.696.663.700.710.575 – neuromuscular nondepolarizing agents
- MeSH D27.505.696.663.850 – sensory system agents
- MeSH D27.505.696.663.850.007 – abuse-deterrent formulations
- MeSH D27.505.696.663.850.007.500 – aversive agents
- MeSH D27.505.696.663.850.014 – analgesics
- MeSH D27.505.696.663.850.014.040 – analgesics, non-narcotic
- MeSH D27.505.696.663.850.014.040.500 – anti-inflammatory agents, non-steroidal
- MeSH D27.505.696.663.850.014.040.500.500 – cyclooxygenase inhibitors
- MeSH D27.505.696.663.850.014.040.500.500.500 – cyclooxygenase 2 inhibitors
- MeSH D27.505.696.663.850.014.580 – analgesics, short-acting
- MeSH D27.505.696.663.850.014.610 – calcitonin gene-related peptide receptor antagonists
- MeSH D27.505.696.663.850.014.640 – dentin desensitizing agents
- MeSH D27.505.696.663.850.014.760 – narcotics
- MeSH D27.505.696.663.850.014.760.500 – analgesics, opioid
- MeSH D27.505.696.663.850.025 – anesthetics, local
- MeSH D27.505.696.663.850.512 – narcotic antagonists
- MeSH D27.505.696.706 – protective agents
- MeSH D27.505.696.706.018 – anticarcinogenic agents
- MeSH D27.505.696.706.037 – antidotes
- MeSH D27.505.696.706.080 – antimutagenic agents
- MeSH D27.505.696.706.125 – antioxidants
- MeSH D27.505.696.706.222 – cariostatic agents
- MeSH D27.505.696.706.320 – cryoprotective agents
- MeSH D27.505.696.706.434 – insect repellents
- MeSH D27.505.696.706.548 – neuroprotective agents
- MeSH D27.505.696.706.776 – radiation-protective agents
- MeSH D27.505.696.706.776.800 – sunscreening agents
- MeSH D27.505.696.706.888 – viscosupplements
- MeSH D27.505.696.875 – reproductive control agents
- MeSH D27.505.696.875.131 – abortifacient agents
- MeSH D27.505.696.875.131.100 – abortifacient agents, nonsteroidal
- MeSH D27.505.696.875.131.200 – abortifacient agents, steroidal
- MeSH D27.505.696.875.360 – contraceptive agents
- MeSH D27.505.696.875.360.276 – contraceptive agents, female
- MeSH D27.505.696.875.360.276.210 – contraceptives, oral
- MeSH D27.505.696.875.360.276.210.100 – contraceptives, oral, combined
- MeSH D27.505.696.875.360.276.210.277 – contraceptives, oral, hormonal
- MeSH D27.505.696.875.360.276.210.400 – contraceptives, oral, sequential
- MeSH D27.505.696.875.360.276.210.443 – contraceptives, oral, synthetic
- MeSH D27.505.696.875.360.276.310 – contraceptives, postcoital
- MeSH D27.505.696.875.360.276.310.235 – contraceptives, postcoital, hormonal
- MeSH D27.505.696.875.360.276.310.360 – contraceptives, postcoital, synthetic
- MeSH D27.505.696.875.360.276.450 – luteolytic agents
- MeSH D27.505.696.875.360.276.500 – menstruation-inducing agents
- MeSH D27.505.696.875.360.276.727 – sperm immobilizing agents
- MeSH D27.505.696.875.360.276.827 – spermatocidal agents
- MeSH D27.505.696.875.360.360 – contraceptive agents, hormonal
- MeSH D27.505.696.875.360.360.500 – contraceptives, oral, hormonal
- MeSH D27.505.696.875.360.360.750 – contraceptives, postcoital, hormonal
- MeSH D27.505.696.875.360.360.875 – luteolytic agents
- MeSH D27.505.696.875.360.360.937 – menstruation-inducing agents
- MeSH D27.505.696.875.360.443 – contraceptive agents, male
- MeSH D27.505.696.875.360.443.068 – antispermatogenic agents
- MeSH D27.505.696.875.360.443.068.760 – spermatogenesis-blocking agents
- MeSH D27.505.696.875.552 – fertility agents
- MeSH D27.505.696.875.552.344 – fertility agents, female
- MeSH D27.505.696.875.552.510 – fertility agents, male
- MeSH D27.505.696.875.610 – luteolytic agents
- MeSH D27.505.696.875.737 – oxytocics
- MeSH D27.505.696.875.825 – tocolytic agents
- MeSH D27.505.696.937 – secretagogues

==== MeSH D27.505.954 – therapeutic uses ====
- MeSH D27.505.954.016 – anti-allergic agents
- MeSH D27.505.954.016.500 – mast cell stabilizers
- MeSH D27.505.954.069 – antiglaucoma agents
- MeSH D27.505.954.122 – anti-infective agents
- MeSH D27.505.954.122.085 – anti-bacterial agents
- MeSH D27.505.954.122.085.222 – antitreponemal agents
- MeSH D27.505.954.122.085.255 – antitubercular agents
- MeSH D27.505.954.122.085.255.135 – antibiotics, antitubercular
- MeSH D27.505.954.122.085.386 – beta lactam antibiotics
- MeSH D27.505.954.122.085.386.500 – first generation cephalosporins
- MeSH D27.505.954.122.085.386.750 – second generation cephalosporins
- MeSH D27.505.954.122.085.386.875 – third generation cephalosporins
- MeSH D27.505.954.122.085.516 – beta-lactamase inhibitors
- MeSH D27.505.954.122.085.777 – leprostatic agents
- MeSH D27.505.954.122.136 – antifungal agents
- MeSH D27.505.954.122.187 – anti-infective agents, local
- MeSH D27.505.954.122.187.500 – hand sanitizers
- MeSH D27.505.954.122.237 – anti-infective agents, urinary
- MeSH D27.505.954.122.250 – antiparasitic agents
- MeSH D27.505.954.122.250.075 – anthelmintics
- MeSH D27.505.954.122.250.075.080 – antinematodal agents
- MeSH D27.505.954.122.250.075.080.275 – filaricides
- MeSH D27.505.954.122.250.075.100 – antiplatyhelmintic agents
- MeSH D27.505.954.122.250.075.100.040 – anticestodal agents
- MeSH D27.505.954.122.250.075.100.750 – schistosomicides
- MeSH D27.505.954.122.250.100 – antiprotozoal agents
- MeSH D27.505.954.122.250.100.055 – amebicides
- MeSH D27.505.954.122.250.100.085 – antimalarials
- MeSH D27.505.954.122.250.100.115 – antitrichomonal agents
- MeSH D27.505.954.122.250.100.170 – coccidiostats
- MeSH D27.505.954.122.250.100.875 – trypanocidal agents
- MeSH D27.505.954.122.388 – antiviral agents
- MeSH D27.505.954.122.388.077 – anti-retroviral agents
- MeSH D27.505.954.122.388.077.088 – anti-hiv agents
- MeSH D27.505.954.122.388.077.088.104 – ccr5 receptor antagonists
- MeSH D27.505.954.122.388.077.088.209 – hiv fusion inhibitors
- MeSH D27.505.954.122.388.077.088.314 – hiv integrase inhibitors
- MeSH D27.505.954.122.388.077.088.420 – hiv protease inhibitors
- MeSH D27.505.954.122.388.308 – reverse transcriptase inhibitors
- MeSH D27.505.954.122.388.538 – viral fusion protein inhibitors
- MeSH D27.505.954.122.388.538.500 – hiv fusion inhibitors
- MeSH D27.505.954.122.388.769 – viral protease inhibitors
- MeSH D27.505.954.122.388.769.250 – coronavirus protease inhibitors
- MeSH D27.505.954.122.388.769.375 – hcv ns3-4a protease inhibitors
- MeSH D27.505.954.122.388.769.500 – hiv protease inhibitors
- MeSH D27.505.954.122.425 – disinfectants
- MeSH D27.505.954.122.425.150 – contact lens solutions
- MeSH D27.505.954.122.425.300 – dental disinfectants
- MeSH D27.505.954.122.425.300.500 – root canal irrigants
- MeSH D27.505.954.122.425.650 – hand sanitizers
- MeSH D27.505.954.158 – anti-inflammatory agents
- MeSH D27.505.954.158.030 – anti-inflammatory agents, non-steroidal
- MeSH D27.505.954.158.030.500 – cyclooxygenase inhibitors
- MeSH D27.505.954.158.030.500.500 – cyclooxygenase 2 inhibitors
- MeSH D27.505.954.158.273 – antifibrotic agents
- MeSH D27.505.954.158.515 – demulcents
- MeSH D27.505.954.158.636 – mast cell stabilizers
- MeSH D27.505.954.158.757 – tumor necrosis factor inhibitors
- MeSH D27.505.954.203 – anti-obesity agents
- MeSH D27.505.954.203.155 – appetite depressants
- MeSH D27.505.954.248 – antineoplastic agents
- MeSH D27.505.954.248.025 – angiogenesis inhibitors
- MeSH D27.505.954.248.106 – antibiotics, antineoplastic
- MeSH D27.505.954.248.125 – anticarcinogenic agents
- MeSH D27.505.954.248.144 – antimetabolites, antineoplastic
- MeSH D27.505.954.248.147 – antimitotic agents
- MeSH D27.505.954.248.150 – antineoplastic agents, alkylating
- MeSH D27.505.954.248.169 – antineoplastic agents, hormonal
- MeSH D27.505.954.248.179 – antineoplastic agents, phytogenic
- MeSH D27.505.954.248.384 – antineoplastic agents, immunological
- MeSH D27.505.954.248.384.500 – immune checkpoint inhibitors
- MeSH D27.505.954.248.538 – mtor inhibitors
- MeSH D27.505.954.248.589 – myeloablative agonists
- MeSH D27.505.954.248.692 – poly(adp-ribose) polymerase inhibitors
- MeSH D27.505.954.248.794 – topoisomerase inhibitors
- MeSH D27.505.954.248.794.500 – topoisomerase i inhibitors
- MeSH D27.505.954.248.794.750 – topoisomerase ii inhibitors
- MeSH D27.505.954.329 – antirheumatic agents
- MeSH D27.505.954.329.030 – anti-inflammatory agents, non-steroidal
- MeSH D27.505.954.329.030.500 – cyclooxygenase inhibitors
- MeSH D27.505.954.329.030.500.500 – cyclooxygenase 2 inhibitors
- MeSH D27.505.954.329.337 – gout suppressants
- MeSH D27.505.954.329.337.900 – uricosuric agents
- MeSH D27.505.954.411 – cardiovascular agents
- MeSH D27.505.954.411.097 – anti-arrhythmia agents
- MeSH D27.505.954.411.162 – antihypertensive agents
- MeSH D27.505.954.411.192 – calcium channel blockers
- MeSH D27.505.954.411.207 – cardioplegic solutions
- MeSH D27.505.954.411.222 – cardiotonic agents
- MeSH D27.505.954.411.320 – fibrinolytic agents
- MeSH D27.505.954.411.455 – natriuretic agents
- MeSH D27.505.954.411.590 – nitric oxide donors
- MeSH D27.505.954.411.645 – potassium channel blockers
- MeSH D27.505.954.411.700 – sclerosing solutions
- MeSH D27.505.954.411.720 – sodium channel blockers
- MeSH D27.505.954.411.720.500 – voltage-gated sodium channel blockers
- MeSH D27.505.954.411.793 – vasoconstrictor agents
- MeSH D27.505.954.411.793.205 – calcium channel agonists
- MeSH D27.505.954.411.793.610 – nasal decongestants
- MeSH D27.505.954.411.918 – vasodilator agents
- MeSH D27.505.954.411.918.500 – endothelium-dependent relaxing factors
- MeSH D27.505.954.427 – central nervous system agents
- MeSH D27.505.954.427.005 – abuse-deterrent formulations
- MeSH D27.505.954.427.005.500 – aversive agents
- MeSH D27.505.954.427.010 – adjuvants, anesthesia
- MeSH D27.505.954.427.020 – alcohol deterrents
- MeSH D27.505.954.427.040 – analgesics
- MeSH D27.505.954.427.040.100 – analgesics, non-narcotic
- MeSH D27.505.954.427.040.381 – analgesics, short-acting
- MeSH D27.505.954.427.040.409 – calcitonin gene-related peptide receptor antagonists
- MeSH D27.505.954.427.040.437 – dentin desensitizing agents
- MeSH D27.505.954.427.040.550 – narcotics
- MeSH D27.505.954.427.040.550.500 – analgesics, opioid
- MeSH D27.505.954.427.080 – anticonvulsants
- MeSH D27.505.954.427.090 – anti-dyskinesia agents
- MeSH D27.505.954.427.090.050 – antiparkinson agents
- MeSH D27.505.954.427.090.050.249 – aromatic amino acid decarboxylase inhibitors
- MeSH D27.505.954.427.090.050.500 – catechol o-methyltransferase inhibitors
- MeSH D27.505.954.427.095 – antiemetics
- MeSH D27.505.954.427.153 – antitussive agents
- MeSH D27.505.954.427.210 – central nervous system depressants
- MeSH D27.505.954.427.210.100 – anesthetics
- MeSH D27.505.954.427.210.100.017 – anesthetics, combined
- MeSH D27.505.954.427.210.100.035 – anesthetics, general
- MeSH D27.505.954.427.210.100.035.060 – anesthetics, inhalation
- MeSH D27.505.954.427.210.100.035.075 – anesthetics, intravenous
- MeSH D27.505.954.427.210.100.035.075.035 – anesthetics, dissociative
- MeSH D27.505.954.427.210.100.200 – anesthetics, local
- MeSH D27.505.954.427.210.350 – hypnotics and sedatives
- MeSH D27.505.954.427.210.350.500 – sleep aids, pharmaceutical
- MeSH D27.505.954.427.210.350.500.500 – orexin receptor antagonists
- MeSH D27.505.954.427.210.600 – narcotics
- MeSH D27.505.954.427.210.600.500 – analgesics, opioid
- MeSH D27.505.954.427.210.950 – tranquilizing agents
- MeSH D27.505.954.427.210.950.015 – anti-anxiety agents
- MeSH D27.505.954.427.210.950.025 – antimanic agents
- MeSH D27.505.954.427.210.950.040 – antipsychotic agents
- MeSH D27.505.954.427.220 – central nervous system stimulants
- MeSH D27.505.954.427.220.045 – aphrodisiacs
- MeSH D27.505.954.427.220.050 – appetite stimulants
- MeSH D27.505.954.427.220.224 – convulsants
- MeSH D27.505.954.427.220.612 – wakefulness-promoting agents
- MeSH D27.505.954.427.270 – emetics
- MeSH D27.505.954.427.525 – muscle relaxants, central
- MeSH D27.505.954.427.550 – narcotic antagonists
- MeSH D27.505.954.427.575 – neuroprotective agents
- MeSH D27.505.954.427.637 – nootropic agents
- MeSH D27.505.954.427.700 – psychotropic drugs
- MeSH D27.505.954.427.700.122 – antidepressive agents
- MeSH D27.505.954.427.700.122.050 – antidepressive agents, second-generation
- MeSH D27.505.954.427.700.122.055 – antidepressive agents, tricyclic
- MeSH D27.505.954.427.700.372 – hallucinogens
- MeSH D27.505.954.427.700.872 – tranquilizing agents
- MeSH D27.505.954.427.700.872.015 – anti-anxiety agents
- MeSH D27.505.954.427.700.872.025 – antimanic agents
- MeSH D27.505.954.427.700.872.331 – antipsychotic agents
- MeSH D27.505.954.444 – dermatologic agents
- MeSH D27.505.954.444.075 – antipruritics
- MeSH D27.505.954.444.100 – astringents
- MeSH D27.505.954.444.200 – emollients
- MeSH D27.505.954.444.400 – keratolytic agents
- MeSH D27.505.954.444.600 – photosensitizing agents
- MeSH D27.505.954.444.695 – sunscreening agents
- MeSH D27.505.954.483 – gastrointestinal agents
- MeSH D27.505.954.483.080 – antacids
- MeSH D27.505.954.483.161 – antidiarrheals
- MeSH D27.505.954.483.200 – antiemetics
- MeSH D27.505.954.483.203 – anti-ulcer agents
- MeSH D27.505.954.483.396 – cathartics
- MeSH D27.505.954.483.508 – cholagogues and choleretics
- MeSH D27.505.954.483.534 – demulcents
- MeSH D27.505.954.483.560 – emetics
- MeSH D27.505.954.483.590 – guanylyl cyclase c agonists
- MeSH D27.505.954.483.620 – laxatives
- MeSH D27.505.954.483.680 – lipotropic agents
- MeSH D27.505.954.493 – genitourinary agents
- MeSH D27.505.954.493.250 – renal agents
- MeSH D27.505.954.493.500 – urological agents
- MeSH D27.505.954.502 – hematologic agents
- MeSH D27.505.954.502.119 – anticoagulants
- MeSH D27.505.954.502.119.500 – antithrombins
- MeSH D27.505.954.502.119.500.500 – factor xa inhibitors
- MeSH D27.505.954.502.135 – antisickling agents
- MeSH D27.505.954.502.140 – blood substitutes
- MeSH D27.505.954.502.140.500 – plasma substitutes
- MeSH D27.505.954.502.270 – coagulants
- MeSH D27.505.954.502.270.232 – agglutinins
- MeSH D27.505.954.502.270.232.500 – hemagglutinins
- MeSH D27.505.954.502.270.463 – hemostatics
- MeSH D27.505.954.502.270.463.046 – anticoagulant reversal agents
- MeSH D27.505.954.502.270.463.091 – antifibrinolytic agents
- MeSH D27.505.954.502.270.546 – heparin antagonists
- MeSH D27.505.954.502.427 – fibrinolytic agents
- MeSH D27.505.954.502.543 – hematinics
- MeSH D27.505.954.502.780 – platelet aggregation inhibitors
- MeSH D27.505.954.557 – lipid regulating agents
- MeSH D27.505.954.557.500 – hypolipidemic agents
- MeSH D27.505.954.557.500.202 – anticholesteremic agents
- MeSH D27.505.954.557.500.202.370 – hydroxymethylglutaryl-coa reductase inhibitors
- MeSH D27.505.954.557.500.202.685 – pcsk9 inhibitors
- MeSH D27.505.954.557.500.601 – lipotropic agents
- MeSH D27.505.954.557.500.601.500 – lipoprotein lipase activators
- MeSH D27.505.954.578 – pharmaceutical solutions
- MeSH D27.505.954.578.322 – cardioplegic solutions
- MeSH D27.505.954.578.483 – dialysis solutions
- MeSH D27.505.954.578.483.651 – hemodialysis solutions
- MeSH D27.505.954.578.645 – ophthalmic solutions
- MeSH D27.505.954.578.645.500 – lubricant eye drops
- MeSH D27.505.954.578.733 – parenteral nutrition solutions
- MeSH D27.505.954.578.733.500 – fat emulsions, intravenous
- MeSH D27.505.954.578.822 – sclerosing solutions
- MeSH D27.505.954.600 – radiation-sensitizing agents
- MeSH D27.505.954.600.710 – photosensitizing agents
- MeSH D27.505.954.705 – reproductive control agents
- MeSH D27.505.954.705.131 – abortifacient agents
- MeSH D27.505.954.705.131.100 – abortifacient agents, nonsteroidal
- MeSH D27.505.954.705.131.200 – abortifacient agents, steroidal
- MeSH D27.505.954.705.360 – contraceptive agents
- MeSH D27.505.954.705.360.276 – contraceptive agents, female
- MeSH D27.505.954.705.360.276.210 – contraceptives, oral
- MeSH D27.505.954.705.360.276.210.100 – contraceptives, oral, combined
- MeSH D27.505.954.705.360.276.210.277 – contraceptives, oral, hormonal
- MeSH D27.505.954.705.360.276.210.400 – contraceptives, oral, sequential
- MeSH D27.505.954.705.360.276.210.443 – contraceptives, oral, synthetic
- MeSH D27.505.954.705.360.276.310 – contraceptives, postcoital
- MeSH D27.505.954.705.360.276.310.235 – contraceptives, postcoital, hormonal
- MeSH D27.505.954.705.360.276.310.360 – contraceptives, postcoital, synthetic
- MeSH D27.505.954.705.360.276.450 – luteolytic agents
- MeSH D27.505.954.705.360.276.500 – menstruation-inducing agents
- MeSH D27.505.954.705.360.276.727 – sperm immobilizing agents
- MeSH D27.505.954.705.360.276.827 – spermatocidal agents
- MeSH D27.505.954.705.360.360 – contraceptive agents, hormonal
- MeSH D27.505.954.705.360.360.500 – contraceptives, oral, hormonal
- MeSH D27.505.954.705.360.360.750 – contraceptives, postcoital, hormonal
- MeSH D27.505.954.705.360.360.875 – luteolytic agents
- MeSH D27.505.954.705.360.360.937 – menstruation-inducing agents
- MeSH D27.505.954.705.360.443 – contraceptive agents, male
- MeSH D27.505.954.705.360.443.068 – antispermatogenic agents
- MeSH D27.505.954.705.360.443.068.760 – spermatogenesis-blocking agents
- MeSH D27.505.954.705.552 – fertility agents
- MeSH D27.505.954.705.552.344 – fertility agents, female
- MeSH D27.505.954.705.552.510 – fertility agents, male
- MeSH D27.505.954.705.610 – luteolytic agents
- MeSH D27.505.954.705.650 – menstruation-inducing agents
- MeSH D27.505.954.705.737 – oxytocics
- MeSH D27.505.954.705.825 – tocolytic agents
- MeSH D27.505.954.796 – respiratory system agents
- MeSH D27.505.954.796.050 – anti-asthmatic agents
- MeSH D27.505.954.796.050.100 – bronchodilator agents
- MeSH D27.505.954.796.090 – antitussive agents
- MeSH D27.505.954.796.170 – bronchoconstrictor agents
- MeSH D27.505.954.796.210 – demulcents
- MeSH D27.505.954.796.250 – expectorants
- MeSH D27.505.954.796.560 – nasal decongestants
- MeSH D27.505.954.796.600 – pulmonary surfactants
- MeSH D27.505.954.803 – senotherapeutics
- MeSH D27.505.954.810 – smoking cessation agents
- MeSH D27.505.954.888 – stimulants, historical

=== MeSH D27.720 – specialty uses of chemicals ===
==== MeSH D27.720.031 – agrochemicals ====
- MeSH D27.720.031.400 – fertilizers
- MeSH D27.720.031.700 – pesticides
- MeSH D27.720.031.700.071 – acaricides
- MeSH D27.720.031.700.141 – chemosterilants
- MeSH D27.720.031.700.288 – fungicides, industrial
- MeSH D27.720.031.700.366 – herbicides
- MeSH D27.720.031.700.366.181 – defoliants, chemical
- MeSH D27.720.031.700.441 – insect repellents
- MeSH D27.720.031.700.491 – insecticides
- MeSH D27.720.031.700.596 – molluscacides
- MeSH D27.720.031.700.672 – pesticide residues
- MeSH D27.720.031.700.748 – pesticide synergists
- MeSH D27.720.031.700.853 – rodenticides

==== MeSH D27.720.102 – biomedical and dental materials ====
- MeSH D27.720.102.130 – biocompatible materials
- MeSH D27.720.102.130.500 – decellularized extracellular matrix
- MeSH D27.720.102.158 – bone cements
- MeSH D27.720.102.187 – cariogenic agents
- MeSH D27.720.102.223 – cariostatic agents
- MeSH D27.720.102.339 – dental materials
- MeSH D27.720.102.339.249 – photoinitiators, dental
- MeSH D27.720.102.339.500 – pulp capping and pulpectomy agents
- MeSH D27.720.102.461 – dermal fillers
- MeSH D27.720.102.583 – mouthwashes
- MeSH D27.720.102.751 – smart materials
- MeSH D27.720.102.751.250 – shape memory alloys
- MeSH D27.720.102.751.500 – stimuli responsive polymers
- MeSH D27.720.102.919 – tissue adhesives

==== MeSH D27.720.233 – coloring agents ====
- MeSH D27.720.233.174 – chromogenic compounds
- MeSH D27.720.233.348 – fluorescent dyes
- MeSH D27.720.233.674 – food coloring agents
- MeSH D27.720.233.837 – hair dyes

==== MeSH D27.720.269 – cosmetics ====
- MeSH D27.720.269.189 – antiperspirants
- MeSH D27.720.269.285 – cosmeceuticals
- MeSH D27.720.269.380 – dentifrices
- MeSH D27.720.269.385 – deodorants
- MeSH D27.720.269.430 – hair preparations
- MeSH D27.720.269.430.214 – hair bleaching agents
- MeSH D27.720.269.430.430 – hair dyes
- MeSH D27.720.269.583 – mouthwashes
- MeSH D27.720.269.700 – perfume
- MeSH D27.720.269.750 – skin lightening preparations
- MeSH D27.720.269.800 – sunscreening agents

==== MeSH D27.720.274 – disinfectants ====
- MeSH D27.720.274.150 – contact lens solutions
- MeSH D27.720.274.300 – dental disinfectants
- MeSH D27.720.274.300.500 – root canal irrigants
- MeSH D27.720.274.650 – hand sanitizers

==== MeSH D27.720.372 – food ingredients ====
- MeSH D27.720.372.300 – food additives
- MeSH D27.720.372.300.350 – fat substitutes
- MeSH D27.720.372.300.353 – flavoring agents
- MeSH D27.720.372.300.353.609 – sweetening agents
- MeSH D27.720.372.300.353.609.500 – non-nutritive sweeteners
- MeSH D27.720.372.300.353.609.750 – nutritive sweeteners
- MeSH D27.720.372.300.353.609.750.250 – dietary sucrose
- MeSH D27.720.372.300.353.609.750.500 – high fructose corn syrup
- MeSH D27.720.372.300.355 – food coloring agents
- MeSH D27.720.372.300.385 – food preservatives

==== MeSH D27.720.395 – ionophores ====
- MeSH D27.720.395.100 – calcium ionophores
- MeSH D27.720.395.400 – potassium ionophores
- MeSH D27.720.395.500 – proton ionophores
- MeSH D27.720.395.750 – sodium ionophores

==== MeSH D27.720.470 – laboratory chemicals ====
- MeSH D27.720.470.280 – buffers
- MeSH D27.720.470.280.060 – ampholyte mixtures
- MeSH D27.720.470.305 – culture media
- MeSH D27.720.470.305.250 – culture media, conditioned
- MeSH D27.720.470.305.255 – culture media, serum-free
- MeSH D27.720.470.410 – indicators and reagents
- MeSH D27.720.470.410.080 – affinity labels
- MeSH D27.720.470.410.080.600 – photoaffinity labels
- MeSH D27.720.470.410.200 – chromogenic compounds
- MeSH D27.720.470.410.210 – cross-linking reagents
- MeSH D27.720.470.410.210.500 – proteolysis targeting chimera
- MeSH D27.720.470.410.360 – intercalating agents
- MeSH D27.720.470.410.505 – luminescent agents
- MeSH D27.720.470.410.505.500 – fluorescent dyes
- MeSH D27.720.470.410.505.500.500 – fluorescent chemosensor compounds
- MeSH D27.720.470.410.577 – neuronal tract-tracers
- MeSH D27.720.470.410.614 – radioactive tracers
- MeSH D27.720.470.410.650 – radiopharmaceuticals
- MeSH D27.720.470.410.680 – reagent kits, diagnostic
- MeSH D27.720.470.410.680.680 – reagent strips
- MeSH D27.720.470.410.690 – reducing agents
- MeSH D27.720.470.410.700 – sulfhydryl reagents
- MeSH D27.720.470.410.750 – thiobarbituric acid reactive substances
- MeSH D27.720.470.420 – ion exchange resins
- MeSH D27.720.470.420.050 – anion exchange resins
- MeSH D27.720.470.420.275 – cation exchange resins
- MeSH D27.720.470.480 – ligands
- MeSH D27.720.470.530 – molecular probes
- MeSH D27.720.470.530.300 – fluorescent chemosensor compounds
- MeSH D27.720.470.530.600 – nucleic acid probes
- MeSH D27.720.470.530.600.150 – antisense elements (genetics)
- MeSH D27.720.470.530.600.150.200 – DNA, antisense
- MeSH D27.720.470.530.600.150.200.640 – oligodeoxyribonucleotides, antisense
- MeSH D27.720.470.530.600.150.640 – oligonucleotides, antisense
- MeSH D27.720.470.530.600.150.640.640 – oligodeoxyribonucleotides, antisense
- MeSH D27.720.470.530.600.150.640.645 – oligoribonucleotides, antisense
- MeSH D27.720.470.530.600.150.760 – rna, antisense
- MeSH D27.720.470.530.600.150.760.645 – oligoribonucleotides, antisense
- MeSH D27.720.470.530.600.223 – DNA probes
- MeSH D27.720.470.530.600.223.260 – DNA, complementary
- MeSH D27.720.470.530.600.223.600 – DNA primers
- MeSH D27.720.470.530.600.223.615 – DNA probes, hla
- MeSH D27.720.470.530.600.223.620 – DNA probes, hpv
- MeSH D27.720.470.530.600.650 – oligonucleotide probes
- MeSH D27.720.470.530.600.825 – rna probes
- MeSH D27.720.470.530.600.825.840 – rna, complementary
- MeSH D27.720.470.765 – small molecule libraries

==== MeSH D27.720.556 – lubricants ====
- MeSH D27.720.556.249 – lubricant eye drops
- MeSH D27.720.556.500 – viscosupplements

==== MeSH D27.720.642 – oxidants ====
- MeSH D27.720.642.315 – bleaching agents
- MeSH D27.720.642.315.249 – hair bleaching agents
- MeSH D27.720.642.315.500 – tooth bleaching agents
- MeSH D27.720.642.631 – oxidants, photochemical

==== MeSH D27.720.693 – personal care products ====
- MeSH D27.720.693.001 – cosmetics
- MeSH D27.720.693.003 – hygiene products

==== MeSH D27.720.744 – pharmaceutic aids ====
- MeSH D27.720.744.064 – adjuvants, pharmaceutic
- MeSH D27.720.744.064.500 – adjuvants, vaccine
- MeSH D27.720.744.064.750 – bioenhancers
- MeSH D27.720.744.179 – aversive agents
- MeSH D27.720.744.294 – flavoring agents
- MeSH D27.720.744.523 – ointment bases
- MeSH D27.720.744.770 – pharmaceutical vehicles
- MeSH D27.720.744.770.419 – excipients
- MeSH D27.720.744.770.419.500 – vaccine excipients
- MeSH D27.720.744.771 – preservatives, pharmaceutical

==== MeSH D27.720.752 – pharmaceutical solutions ====
- MeSH D27.720.752.322 – cardioplegic solutions
- MeSH D27.720.752.483 – dialysis solutions
- MeSH D27.720.752.483.651 – hemodialysis solutions
- MeSH D27.720.752.608 – ophthalmic solutions
- MeSH D27.720.752.608.500 – lubricant eye drops
- MeSH D27.720.752.733 – parenteral nutrition solutions
- MeSH D27.720.752.733.500 – fat emulsions, intravenous
- MeSH D27.720.752.822 – sclerosing solutions

==== MeSH D27.720.777 – poisons ====
- MeSH D27.720.777.300 – chemical warfare agents
- MeSH D27.720.777.300.500 – nerve agents

==== MeSH D27.720.799 – protective agents ====
- MeSH D27.720.799.018 – anticarcinogenic agents
- MeSH D27.720.799.037 – antidotes
- MeSH D27.720.799.042 – antimutagenic agents
- MeSH D27.720.799.047 – antioxidants
- MeSH D27.720.799.080 – cardiotonic agents
- MeSH D27.720.799.113 – cariostatic agents
- MeSH D27.720.799.180 – cryoprotective agents
- MeSH D27.720.799.763 – radiation-protective agents
- MeSH D27.720.799.763.764 – sunscreening agents

==== MeSH D27.720.821 – riot control agents, chemical ====
- MeSH D27.720.821.500 – tear gases

==== MeSH D27.720.832 – sequestering agents ====
- MeSH D27.720.832.500 – chelating agents
- MeSH D27.720.832.500.204 – calcium chelating agents
- MeSH D27.720.832.500.410 – iron chelating agents
- MeSH D27.720.832.500.410.750 – siderophores

==== MeSH D27.720.844 – solvents ====
- MeSH D27.720.844.250 – deep eutectic solvents
- MeSH D27.720.844.500 – ionic liquids

==== MeSH D27.720.877 – surface-active agents ====
- MeSH D27.720.877.048 – antifoaming agents
- MeSH D27.720.877.102 – biosurfactants
- MeSH D27.720.877.156 – demulcents
- MeSH D27.720.877.265 – detergents
- MeSH D27.720.877.265.861 – soaps
- MeSH D27.720.877.383 – emulsifying agents
- MeSH D27.720.877.383.500 – cerumenolytic agents
- MeSH D27.720.877.501 – immunosorbents
- MeSH D27.720.877.974 – wetting agents

==== MeSH D27.720.944 – viscoelastic substances ====
- MeSH D27.720.944.500 – viscosupplements

=== MeSH D27.888 – toxic actions ===
==== MeSH D27.888.284 – environmental pollutants ====
- MeSH D27.888.284.101 – air pollutants
- MeSH D27.888.284.101.268 – air pollutants, occupational
- MeSH D27.888.284.101.393 – air pollutants, radioactive
- MeSH D27.888.284.101.696 – greenhouse gases
- MeSH D27.888.284.429 – persistent organic pollutants
- MeSH D27.888.284.756 – soil pollutants
- MeSH D27.888.284.756.674 – soil pollutants, radioactive
- MeSH D27.888.284.903 – water pollutants
- MeSH D27.888.284.903.655 – water pollutants, chemical
- MeSH D27.888.284.903.821 – water pollutants, radioactive

==== MeSH D27.888.426 – hazardous substances ====
- MeSH D27.888.426.500 – hazardous waste
- MeSH D27.888.426.500.638 – radioactive waste

==== MeSH D27.888.569 – noxae ====
- MeSH D27.888.569.035 – alkylating agents
- MeSH D27.888.569.035.035 – antineoplastic agents, alkylating
- MeSH D27.888.569.042 – antimetabolites
- MeSH D27.888.569.042.030 – antimetabolites, antineoplastic
- MeSH D27.888.569.071 – antispermatogenic agents
- MeSH D27.888.569.071.379 – sperm immobilizing agents
- MeSH D27.888.569.071.569 – spermatocidal agents
- MeSH D27.888.569.071.760 – spermatogenesis-blocking agents
- MeSH D27.888.569.100 – carcinogens
- MeSH D27.888.569.100.125 – carcinogens, environmental
- MeSH D27.888.569.100.675 – peroxisome proliferators
- MeSH D27.888.569.142 – cardiotoxins
- MeSH D27.888.569.185 – caustics
- MeSH D27.888.569.199 – cytostatic agents
- MeSH D27.888.569.213 – cytotoxins
- MeSH D27.888.569.213.444 – hemolytic agents
- MeSH D27.888.569.242 – dermotoxins
- MeSH D27.888.569.279 – immunotoxins
- MeSH D27.888.569.300 – irritants
- MeSH D27.888.569.468 – mutagens
- MeSH D27.888.569.468.060 – aneugens
- MeSH D27.888.569.504 – neurotoxins
- MeSH D27.888.569.540 – oxidants
- MeSH D27.888.569.540.631 – oxidants, photochemical
- MeSH D27.888.569.612 – poisons
- MeSH D27.888.569.612.150 – chemical warfare agents
- MeSH D27.888.569.673 – pyrogens
- MeSH D27.888.569.734 – riot control agents, chemical
- MeSH D27.888.569.734.500 – tear gases
- MeSH D27.888.569.864 – teratogens

==== MeSH D27.888.723 – pesticides ====
- MeSH D27.888.723.071 – acaricides
- MeSH D27.888.723.141 – chemosterilants
- MeSH D27.888.723.288 – fungicides, industrial
- MeSH D27.888.723.366 – herbicides
- MeSH D27.888.723.366.181 – defoliants, chemical
- MeSH D27.888.723.441 – insect repellents
- MeSH D27.888.723.491 – insecticides
- MeSH D27.888.723.596 – molluscacides
- MeSH D27.888.723.697 – pesticide residues
- MeSH D27.888.723.748 – pesticide synergists
- MeSH D27.888.723.853 – rodenticides

The list continues at List of MeSH codes (E01).
