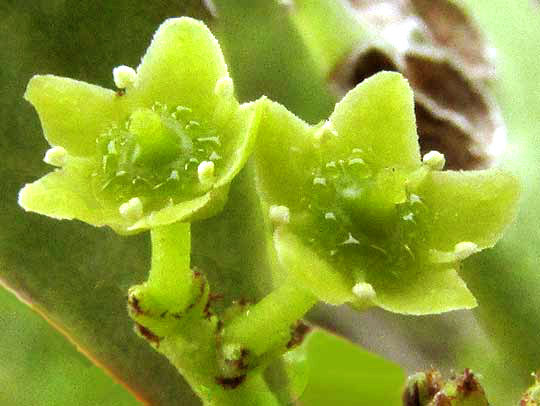
- Maytenus phyllanthoides flower

Scientific classification
- Kingdom: Plantae
- Clade: Tracheophytes
- Clade: Angiosperms
- Clade: Eudicots
- Clade: Rosids
- Order: Celastrales
- Family: Celastraceae
- Genus: Maytenus
- Species: M. phyllanthoides

Binomial name
- Maytenus phyllanthoides Benth.

Synonyms
- Tricerma phyllanthoides (Benth.) Lundell (1971)

= Maytenus phyllanthoides =

Species of flowering plant

Maytenus phyllanthoides, known variously as the Florida mayten, leather leaf, gutta-percha, maidenbush and mangle dulce, is a tree or shrub belonging to the family Celastraceae.

== Description ==
Maytenus phyllanthoides grows up to 7m tall (23 feet), and its stems are covered with fine, soft hairs. Depending on the variety, it can stand erect, spread, lean on other plants, or lie on the ground. Its leaves are on petioles up to 6mm long (~1/4 inch), and more or less elliptic in shape but tending to be wider toward the leaf's tip, which is blunt to rounded, and sometimes bearing a tiny tooth or mucro. Typically, the blade base gradually diminishes to the petole, though blades of the variety along the Gulf Coast tend to be rounded. Blade margins can bear a few tiny teeth, though they are usually toothless and sometimes wavy.

Flowers of Maytenus phyllanthoides arise along the stem either solitarily or a few in a cluster. Flowers display radial symmetry and bear 5 rounded petals up to 3mm long. They have a conspicuous, somewhat flat ring, the nectar-secreting "intrastaminal nectariferous disk", in the flower's center, surrounding the pistil; such disks occur in several plant families. Flowers may contain both male and female parts, being monoecious, or else bear sexual parts of only one sex, being dioecious. In male flowers, with 5 functional stamens, the stamens' filaments are inserted beneath the nectar-producing disk. In female flowers there is a single pistil, and the ovary is superior; the petals alternate with staminodes.

Capsular-type fruits up to 12mm long x 6mm wide turn pale brownish to orangish, dry and split open when mature, exposing one to three seeds, each seed completely surrounded by a fleshy, bright red aril.

== Distribution ==
The iNaturalist map indicating observations of Maytenus phyllanthoides locates the species in Florida and southern Texas of the USA, much of Mexico, and Cuba. Other reports also place it in the Bahamas.

== Habitat ==
Maytenus phyllanthoides occurs on hammocks, dunes, and at edges of mangrove forests. The variety ovalifolia is described as inhabiting coastal prairies, marshes, clay or sand-clay mounds and often is found in saline sites.

== Human uses ==
Medicinally, among the Mayo people of northwestern Mexico, the leaves of Maytenus phyllanthoides are mixed with petroleum jelly and applied to lingering sores. Also it's reported that some chew the leaves to alleviate stomach problems, as well as toothache and scurvy. Gum from the plant has been used to bind splints for broken limbs, and other uses. A 2014 study found that the species contains lyoniresinol, a compound recognized as an antitrichomonal agent that acts on Trichomonas parasites.

In the countryside, branches of the plant break off easily and burn well as firewood. Goats also eat the leaves.

Gardeners and landscapers may plant it because it's a mounding, evergreen shrub of a convenient size and deep green color. It produces relatively little litter, and makes good shelter for birds and butterflies. It's highly salt tolerant and thrives on little water. However, some gardeners don't like its slow growth rate.

== Taxonomy ==
Two varieties of Maytenus phyllanthoides are recognized:

- Maytenus phyllanthoides var. phyllanthoides
- Maytenus phyllanthoides var. ovalifolia Loes.

The first-listed occurs over the species' entire distribution area. The second is limited to the Gulf coast of Texas, from Cameron to Nueces Counties, and into Mexico in Tamaulipas state. It differs from variety phyllanthoides in that its short-petiolate leaves are rounded at their bases, and they consistently tend to grow as prostrate shrubs.

== Etymology ==
The genus name Maytenus is based on a vernacular name used in Chile, mayten, used for the type specimen upon which the genus was named.

In the species name phyllanthoides, the suffix -oides is from the Ancient Greek oeidēs meaning "similar to". In this case, it means that Maytenus phyllanthoides is similar to the genus Phyllanthus.

== Gallery ==
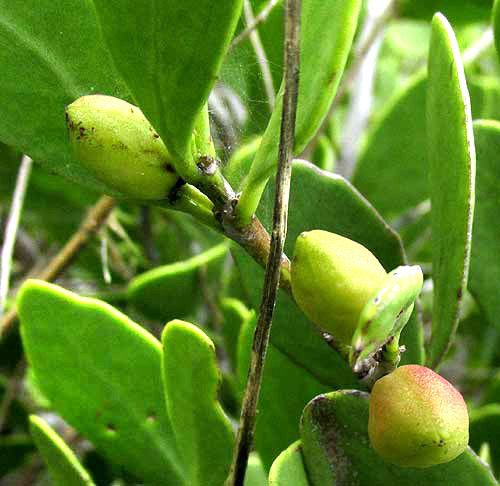
Maytenus phllanthoides immature fruits

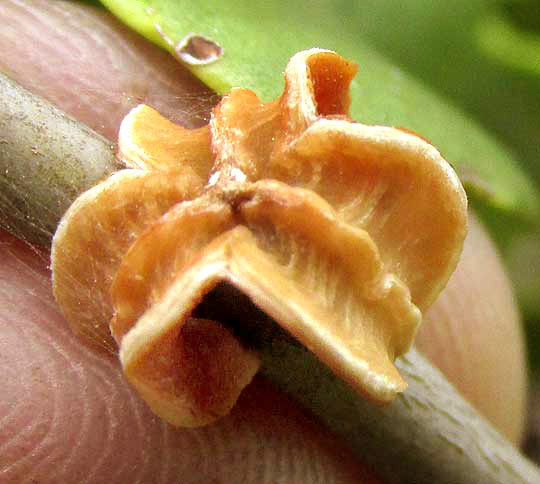
Maytenus phllanthoides fruit pericarp remaining on stem after the seed has been removed

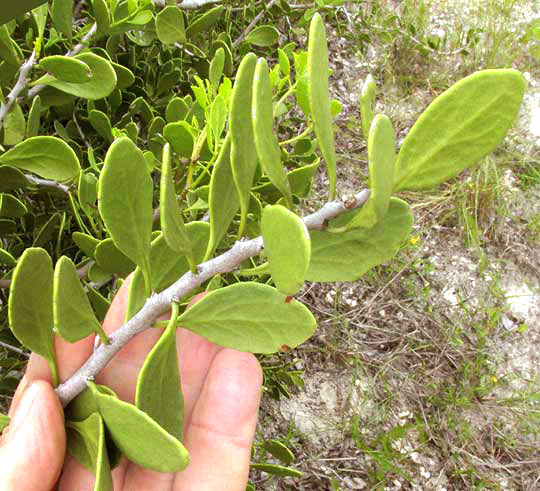
Maytenus phllanthoides leafy stem

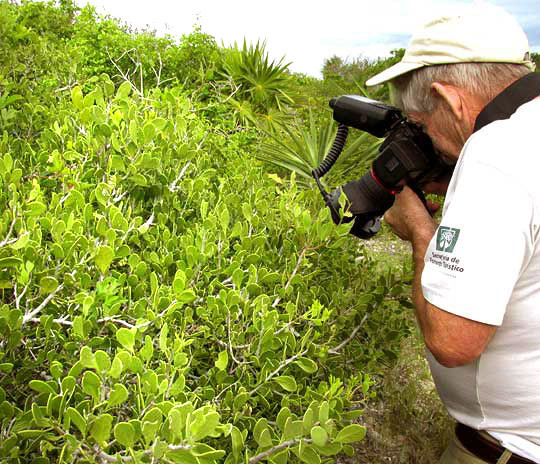
Maytenus phllanthoides dense, rounded bush
