= Crotylsarin =

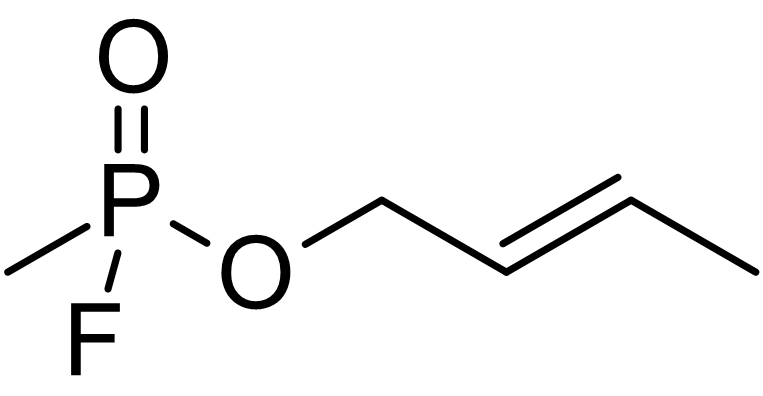

Names
- Preferred IUPAC name (2E)-But-2-en-1-yl methylphosphonofluoridate
- Other names CRS

Identifiers
CAS Number	138780-00-4
3D model (JSmol)	Interactive image
ChemSpider	4943171
PubChem CID	6438716
UNII	Y98LED33GD
CompTox Dashboard (EPA)	DTXSID701254289
- InChI: InChI=1S/C5H10FO2P/c1-3-4-5-8-9(2,6)7/h3-4H,5H2,1-2H3/b4-3+ Key: CSVWTPQEXJLYLO-ONEGZZNKSA-N
- SMILES: C/C=C/COP(=O)(C)F

Properties
Chemical formula	C_{5}H_{10}FO_{2}P
Molar mass	152.105 g·mol^{−1}
- Except where otherwise noted, data are given for materials in their standard state (at 25 °C [77 °F], 100 kPa). Infobox references

Crotylsarin (CRS) is an extremely toxic organophosphate nerve agent of the G-series. Like other nerve agents, CRS irreversibly inhibits acetylcholinesterase. However, since the inhibited enzyme ages so rapidly, it can't be reactivated by cholinesterase reactivators.

== See also ==
- Nerve agent
- Soman
