= Female fertility agents =

Compounds to increase women's capacity to conceive

Female fertility agents are medications that improve female's ability to conceive pregnancy. These agents are prescribed for infertile female who fails to conceive pregnancy after 1-year of regular and unprotected sexual intercourse. The following will cover the advancements of female fertility agents, major causes of female infertility. Next, it emphasizes on common female fertility agents in terms of their mechanism of action, side effects, fetal consideration and clinical application and ended up by the introduction of supplements and herbal medicines for female infertility.

== Causes ==
Female infertility can be caused by multiple factors, such as ovulatory disorders, structural abnormalities in reproductive organs and aging.

=== 1. Ovulatory disorders ===
Ovulatory disorders result in infrequent ovulation (Oligoovulation) or absent ovulation (anovulation) which causes infertility. The World Health Organisation (WHO) has classified anovulation into three main classes, which are hypogonadotropic hypogonadal anovulation (Class 1), normogonadotropic normoestrogenic anovulation (Class 2), and hypergonadotropic hypoestrogenic anovulation (Class 3). Apart from the three classes, hyperprolactinemic anovulation is also identified as one of the etiologies.

=== 2. Structural abnormalities ===
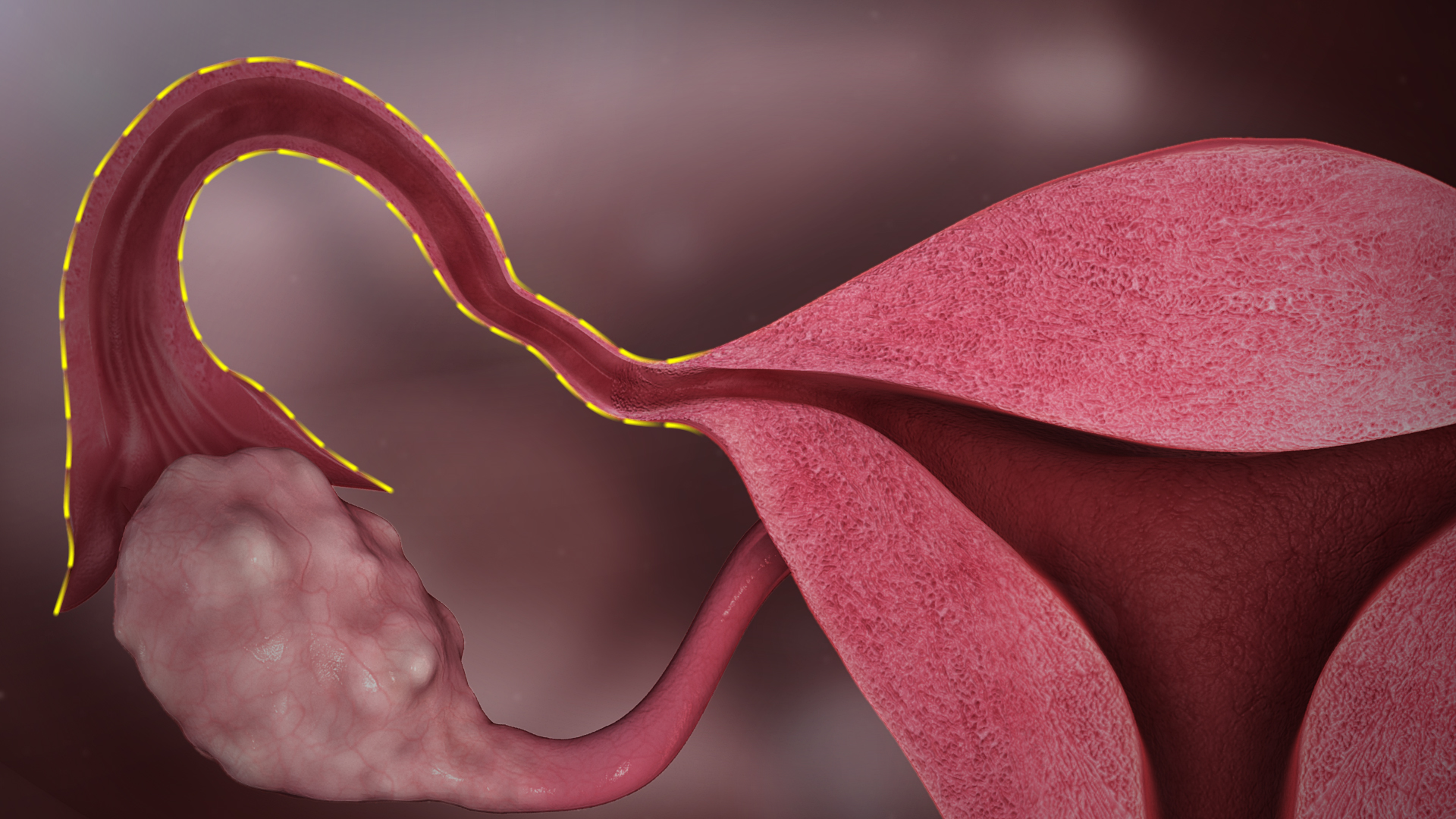
Animation of Fallopian tube

More refer to Tubal Factor Infertility

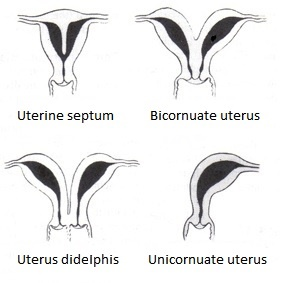
Image of uterine malformation

Structural abnormalities in female reproductive organs will lead to infertility. Abnormalities in Fallopian tube, either blockage or injuries will prevent fertilization and/or implantation. Besides, anomalies in uterus, commonly caused by Müllerian anomalies will cause failure in implantation.

=== 3. Aging ===
More refer to Age and female fertility

Female fertility declines with aging due to the decreased quantity and quality of oocytes. It is noticed that the number of follicles reduces rapidly after the age of 37 when close to menopause, resulting in a natural decline in fertility.

== Medication ==
=== 1. Gonadotropin therapy ===
==== Drug action ====
Female gonadotropins include follicle stimulating hormone (FSH), luteinizing hormone (LH), and human chorionic gonadotropin (hCG). Gonadotropin therapy refers to the administration of exogenous gonadotropins to treat anovulation. Gonadotropin therapy is given via intrauterine insemination (IUI) and in vitro fertilization (IVF) to exert its effects. FSH promotes the recruitment and maturation of early antral follicles, while LH helps follicular development and maturation. Both FSH and LH regulate the length and order of the menstrual cycle in female. HCG aids the ultimate follicular maturation and growth of the immature oocyte in meiosis and in the luteal phase.

==== Side effects ====
Gonadotropin treatment may induce ovarian hyperstimulation syndrome due to several enlarged follicles. The enlarged ovaries will lead to severe abdominal pain, vomiting, clotting in the lungs and legs along with fluid imbalance.

==== Fetal considerations ====
Gonadotropin therapy has a higher tendency to cause multiple pregnancy when compared to clomiphene and aromatase inhibitors. Multiple pregnancy may increase the risks of preterm birth and decreased gestational age, which are associated with fetal complications and higher infant mortality.

==== Clinical use ====
Gonadotropin therapy can be given to female who have ovulatory failure and irregular ovulation as second-line treatment. It can be given to female who has normal ovulation but fails to conceive by in vitro fertilization (IVF) to boost the production of more follicles in the ovaries. For patients with polyendocrine metabolic ovarian syndrome (PMOS), gonadotropin is not an initial treatment choice. During early stage of Gonadotrophin therapy, blood testing and pelvic ultrasound are performed to confirm the absence of large ovarian cysts. The treatment initiation and dosage of gonadotropin will be instructed depending on the outcome of the tests. During the therapy, regular blood testing and pelvic ultrasound is required. Discontinuation of the therapy is required if more than three large follicles are detected in pelvic ultrasound.

=== 2. Clomiphene ===
Chemical structure of Clomiphene

==== Drug action ====
Clomiphene acts on the hypothalamus. By occupying intracellular estrogen receptors (ERs), receptor recycling is interfered. This inhibits hypothalamic ERs and hence interrupts normal estrogenic negative feedback. As a result, Gonadotropin-releasing hormone pulsation occurs which induces the release of pituitary gonadotropin to boost follicular growth and trigger ovulation.

==== Side effects ====
Common side effects include ovarian enlargement, hot flash, abdominal distention, breast discomfort, and hyperlipidemia. Rare adverse effects are ovarian hyperstimulation syndrome and visual abnormalities. Long-term use may raise risk of ovarian cancer, such that long-term therapy (more than 6 cycles) is not recommended.

==== Fetal considerations ====
Compared to the general population, clomiphene does not exhibit a tendency toward increasing the risk of miscarriages or harmful fetal abnormalities. For breastfeeding consideration, a study found that clomiphene effectively suppresses lactation, which can be explained by prolactin inhibition. It is reported that clomiphene is present in breast milk, maximum content of breast milk recorded was 582.5 ng/mL which is still be considered as acceptable when relative infant dose of a drug is less than 10%. Nevertheless, breastfeeding is still debatable due to lack of clinical evidence.

==== Clinical use ====
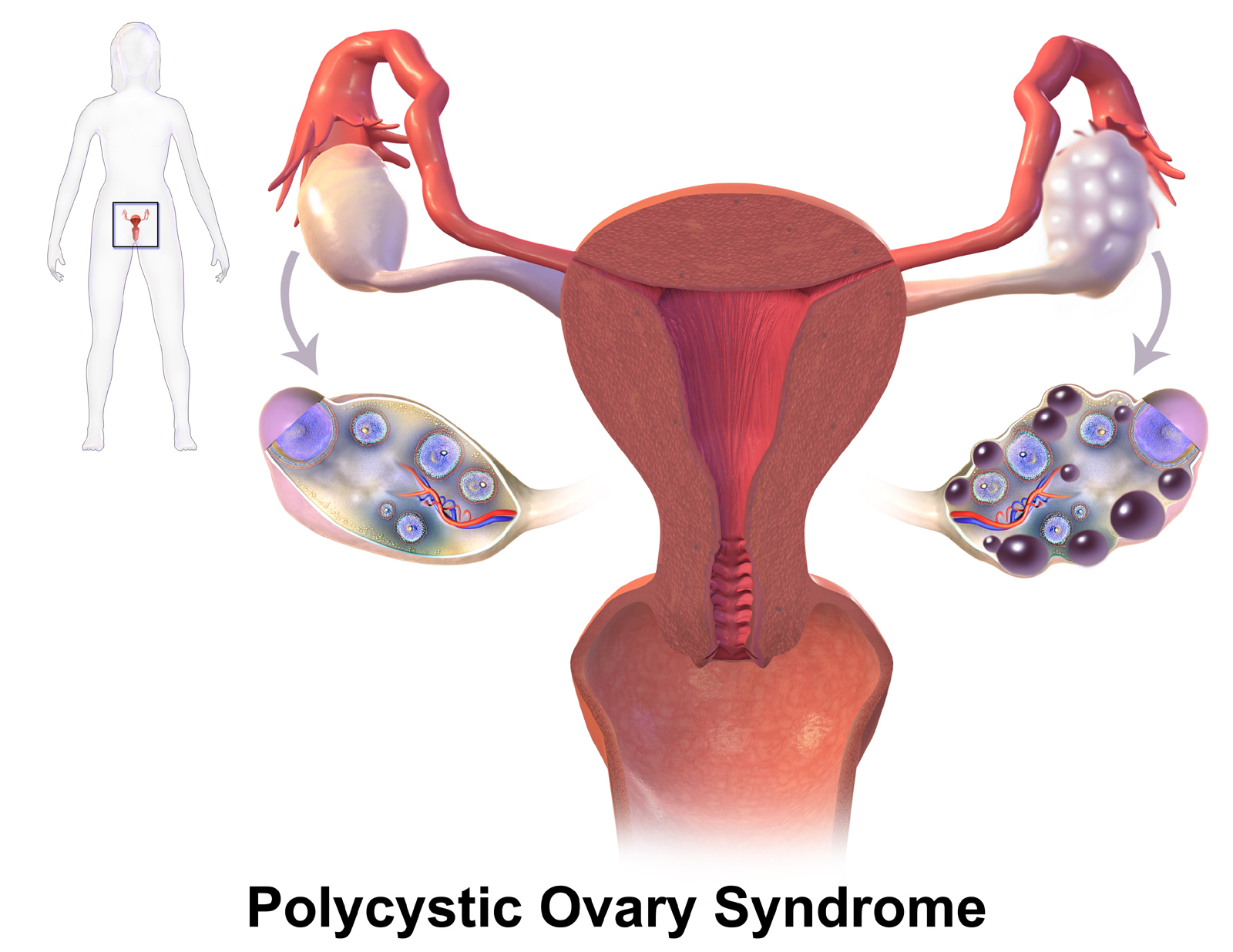
Polyendocrine metabolic ovarian syndrome (PMOS) (formerly known as polycystic ovary syndrome)

Clomiphene is initiated for use in patients with polyendocrine metabolic ovarian syndrome (PMOS), psychogenic amenorrhea, post-oral contraceptive amenorrhea, and secondary amenorrhea of unidentified cause. Serum estrogen should be measured prior to therapy which rules out primary pituitary or ovarian failure, endometrial carcinoma, hyperprolactinaemia.

Chemical structure of Letrozole

=== 3. Aromatase Inhibitors: Letrozole ===
==== Drug action ====
Among all aromatase inhibitors, Letrozole is commonly used for improving female fertility. It works by inhibiting aromatase which is an enzyme that catalyses the conversion of androstenedione and testosterone to estrogen by hydroxylation. Hence, Letrozole inhibits the synthesis of estrogen. The hypoestrogenic state boosts the release of gonadotropin-release hormone and raises the synthesis of FSH in pituitary gland.

==== Side effects ====
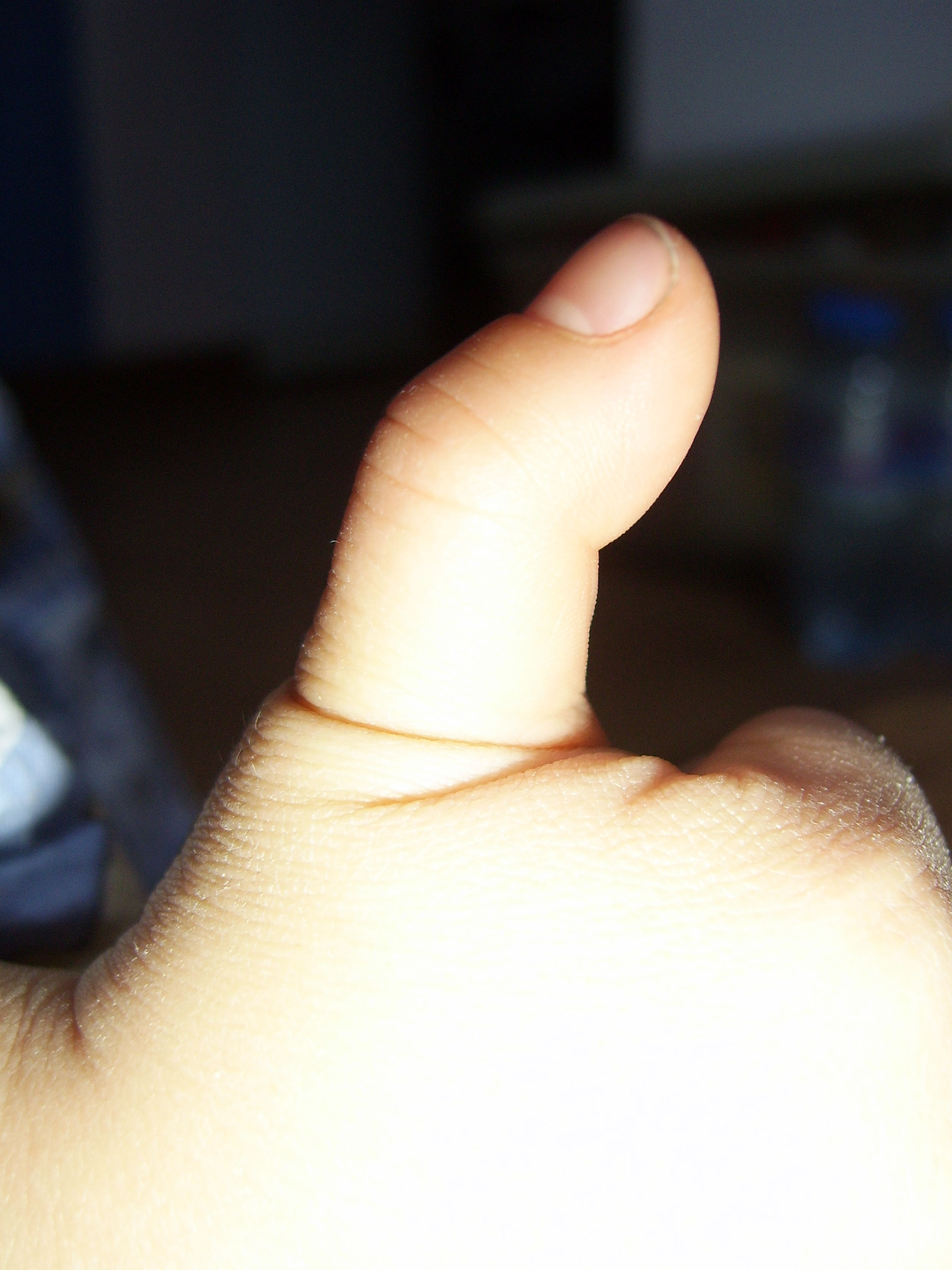
Example of tenosynovitis

Common side effects include bone fracture due to bone mineral density loss, ischemic cardiovascular events like angina pectoris, acute myocardial infarction, and musculoskeletal effects for instance arthralgia and tenosynovitis.

==== Fetal considerations ====
Letrozole raises concern regarding its teratogenicity. It is potentially teratogenic if administered unintentionally during early stages of pregnancy as they can interrupt with normal Aromatase activity in embryonic development indicated in animal experiments. However, teratogenicity is not observed with an increase tend compared to clomiphene. In addition, it is stated in a systematic review and meta-analysis that letrozole does not associate with congenital fetal malformation or miscarriage compared to clomiphene, gonadotropin and natural conception.

==== Clinical use ====
Besides being a first-line medication for hormone receptor-positive breast cancer, it also acts as an off-label agent for ovulation induction in patients with polyendocrine metabolic ovarian syndrome (PMOS) and anovulatory infertility in recent years. It is stated that letrozole therapy leads to greater birth rates compared to clomiphene in a randomized trial and meta-analysis with large sample of anovulatory women.

Chemical structure of Metformin

=== 4. Metformin ===
==== Drug action ====
Metformin lowers the synthesis of glucose in liver and absorption of glucose from intestines. It also acquires an antilipolytic effect which reduces free fatty acid concentration. It is proved in many trials that Metformin can normalize menstrual function and raise the chance of ovulation.

==== Side effects ====
Common side effects are gastrointestinal discomfort, for example flatulence, indigestion, nausea and vomiting which are reversible by dosage adjustment and discontinuation.

==== Fetal considerations ====
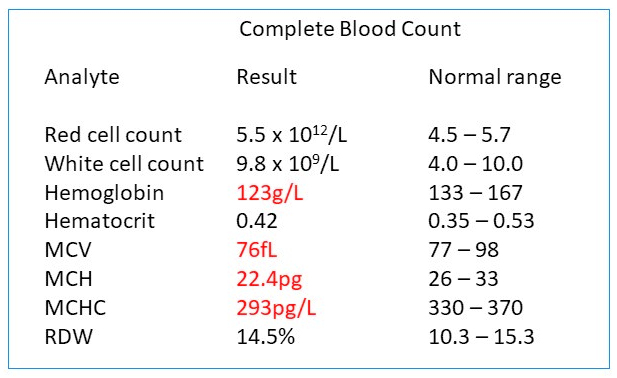
Table of complete blood count

Metformin reduces intestinal absorption of vitamin B12 and also serum vitamin B12 concentration, thus patients are recommended to monitor B12 deficiency with complete blood count. Regarding breastfeeding, metformin does not show obvious association with adverse outcomes. In addition, metformin is not associated with a raised chance of major birth abnormalities in females with polyendocrine metabolic ovarian syndrome (PMOS).

==== Clinical use ====
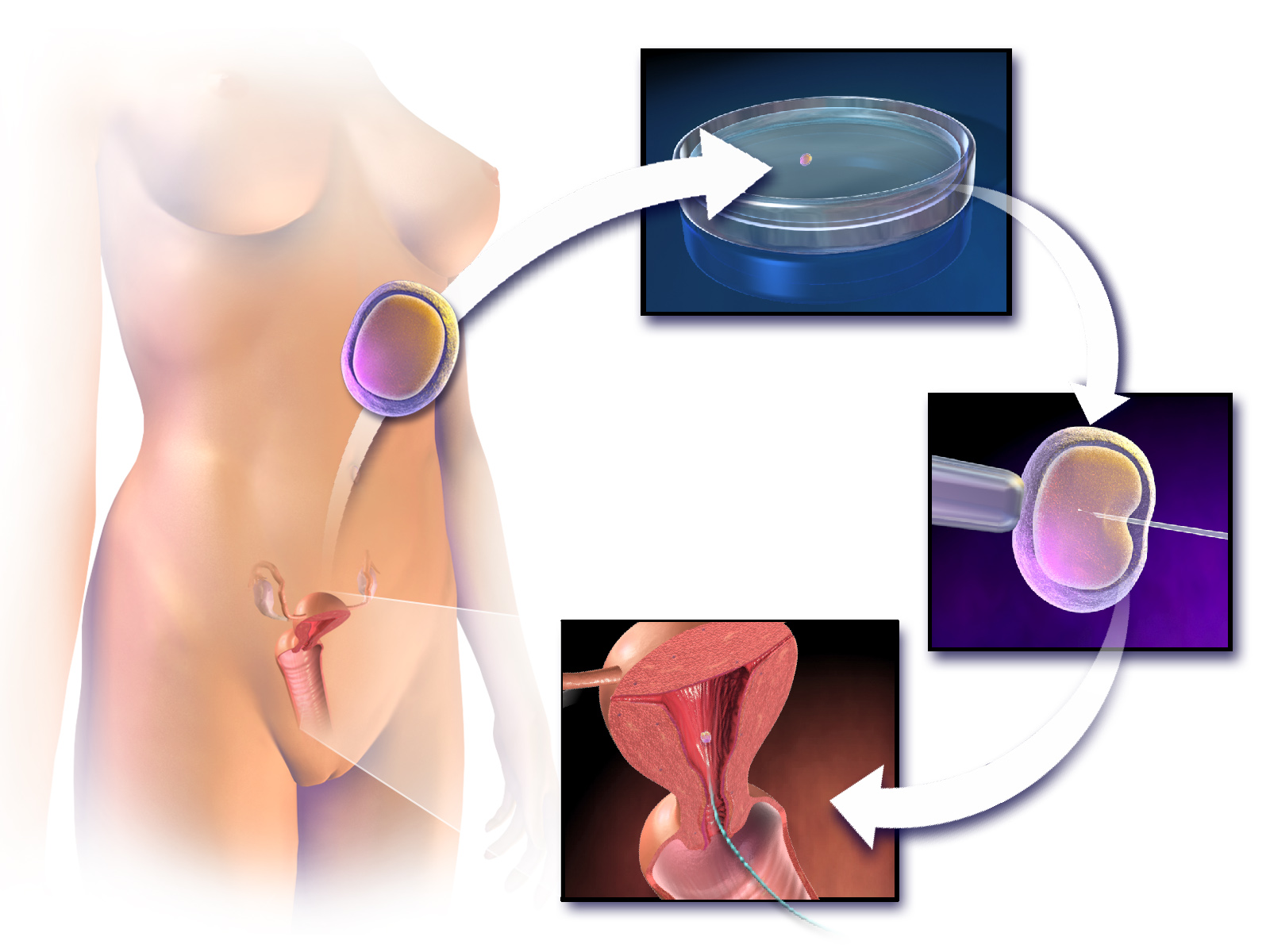
Procedures of In-vitro Fertilization

Metformin is often used as second-line treatment especially in polyendocrine metabolic ovarian syndrome (PMOS) patients are contraindicated to treatment of combined estrogen-progestogen oral contraceptives (COCs). It is proved that Metformin can restore ovulatory menses in PMOS in numerous trials. 13 trials are studies in a meta-analysis, fourfold increase of ovulation is revealed when using clomiphene with metformin compared to using clomiphene alone. In addition, Metformin can be administered for IVF pretreatment, the number of retrieved oocytes is greatly lowered. Moreover, ovarian hyperstimulation syndrome (OHSS) is prevented. Metformin administered to women with PMOS before or during in vitro fertilisation or intra-cytoplasmic sperm injection does not improve live birth rates; it may reduce the incidence of OHSS, but with possibly higher side effects.

=== 5. Dopamine agonist—Cabergoline and Bromocriptine ===
==== Drug action ====
Dopamine agonists, cabergoline and bromocriptine bind to specific dopamine receptors to block the secretion pathway of prolactin and shrink the size of tumor (prolactinoma), which subsequently treat infertility caused by elevated level of prolactin.(See also : Hyperprolactinaemia)

Chemical structure of Bromocriptine

Bromocriptine possesses both dopamine 2 receptor agonistic and dopamine 1 receptor antagonistic properties. It is an ergot derivative, which directly binds to the postsynaptic dopamine 2 receptors of anterior pituitary cells and inhibits the secretion of prolactin.

Chemical structure of cabergoline

Cabergoline is a dopamine 2 receptor agonist which is also an ergot derivative. It functions similarly to bromocriptine but with higher selectivity and affinity than bromocriptine.

==== Side effects ====
The major side effects of dopamine agonists include nausea, vomiting, arrhythmia and postural hypotension. Other adverse effects for instance impulse-control disorder and valvular heart disease are less frequently resulted.

==== Fetal considerations ====
Dopamine agonists are usually discontinued once the patient is pregnant. Based on existing data and studies, the exposure of fetus to dopamine agonists during the early stage of pregnancy does not harm the foetus. Both bromocriptine and cabergoline are considered to be safe with no identifiable risk of inducing congenital deformity, miscarriage and premature birth.

==== Clinical use ====
Dopamine agonists for infertility treatment are commonly administered to hyperprolactinemic anovulation patients. Both bromocriptine and cabergoline are the first-line dopamine agonist in hyperprolactinemia treatment. Cabergoline is currently more preferred than bromocriptine due to its higher efficacy and fewer side effects like nausea.

== Supplements ==
Chemical structure of Coenzyme Q10

=== Coenzyme Q10 ===
Coenzyme Q10 is a natural antioxidant. It is stated in randomized trials that its supplementation increases the number of oocytes, which contributes to a greater fertilization rate and improved embryonic development in women with suboptimal ovarian reserve parameters.

=== Myoinositol ===
Myoinositol is a naturally existing substance that is involved in both insulin and gonadotropin signaling, which is associated with follicle maturation. Multiple researches have indicated that myoinositol supplementation in poor ovarian responders can improve fertilization rate and ovarian sensitivity index (OSI).

== Herbal medicines ==
=== Chasteberry ===
The extracts of Chasteberry Vitex agnus castus improve premenstrual symptoms, especially premenstrual mastodynia (breast pain) which is caused by hyperprolactinemia and hence explains female infertility. In addition, low progesterone level is also attributed to female infertility. Combination of VAC extracts and medication can normalize the levels of prolactin and progesterone. Therefore, Chasteberry alleviates infertility condition.

=== Red clover ===
The red clover (Trifolium pratense) extracts contain several phytoestrogenic compounds, which stimulate the production of female hormone and bind to the beta estrogen receptor so as to mitigate the menopausal symptoms. Due to the presence of phytoestrogenic compounds, red clover extract can raise estrogen level and thus trigger ovulation and aid fertility.

== History of female fertility agents ==
In 1931, the first commercially available human chorionic gonadotropin (hCG) was launched, which marked the first emergence of female fertility agents. Subsequently, clomiphene citrate was discovered in 1951, which was then approved by the Food and Drug Administration (FDA) in 1967. In 1978, bromocriptine gained FDA approval for hyperprolactinemia and later proved effective in treating prolactinemia-related infertility. As a breakthrough, hMG/hCG protocols for pre-IVF treatment were introduced.

The first recombinant human follicle-stimulating hormone (r-hFSH) received EU approval in 1995, followed by the approval of recombinant human luteinizing hormone (rhLH) and recombinant human chorionic gonadotropin (rhCG) in 2000.

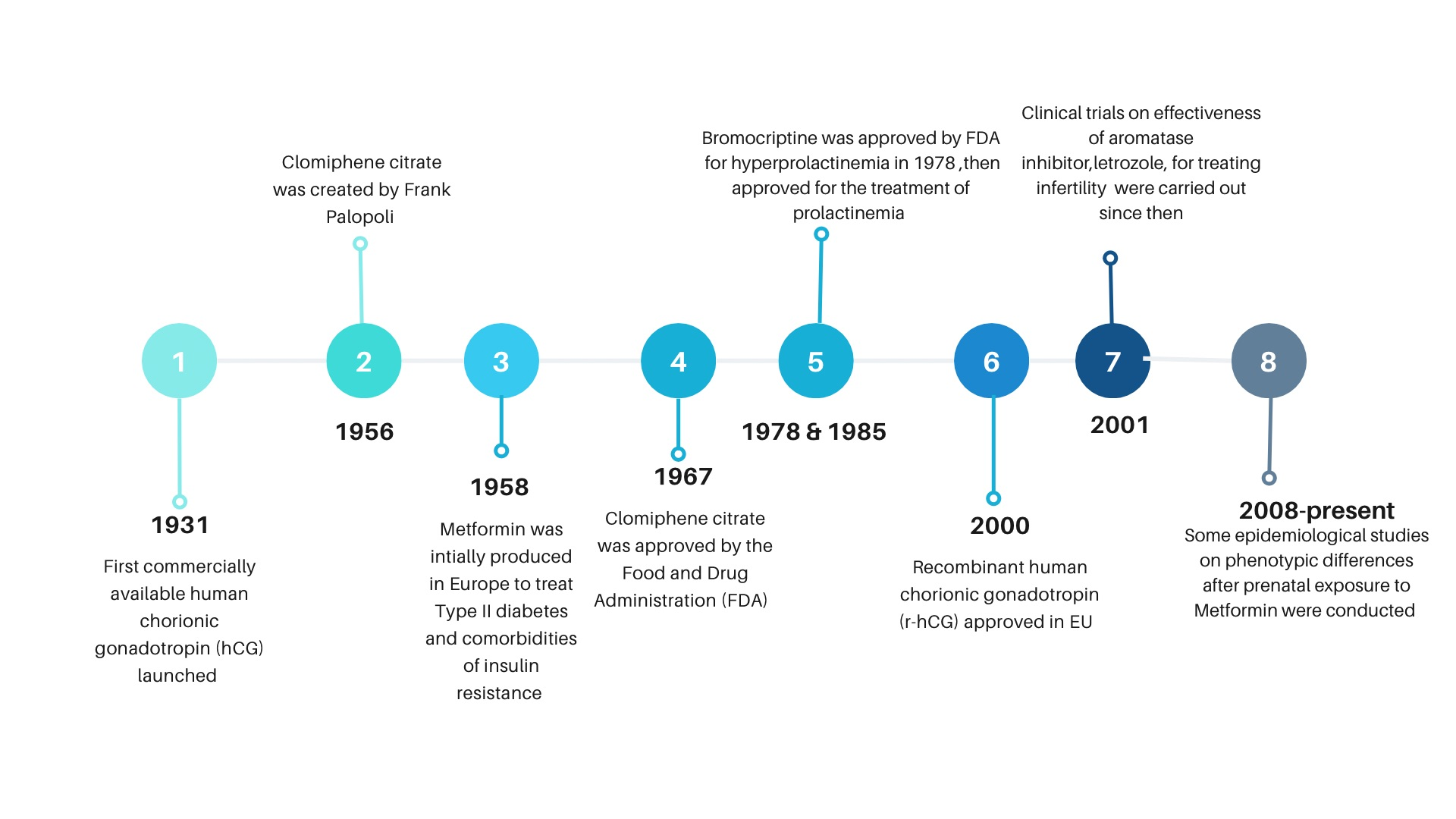
History of development of Clomiphene citrate, aromatase inhibitor, Metformin & dopamine agonist

In the 2000s, there were clinical trials exploring the effectiveness of the aromatase inhibitor letrozole for infertility treatment and ongoing epidemiological studies examining the phenotypic differences associated with prenatal exposure to metformin. There is some evidence that letrozole can improve the rate of live births and the rate of pregnancy rate for people who experience anovulatory polyendocrine metabolic ovarian syndrome (PMOS), and this treatment may be more effective than SERMs. There is high quality evidence that the rate of people developing ovarian hyperstimulation syndrome is similar between SERMs and letrozole. There is also high quality evidence to conclusion that there is no difference in the rate of pregnancy loss and the rate that women may have multiple pregnancies when comparing letrozole and SERMs.
