= Fixative =

A fixative is a stabilizing or preservative agent:

- Dye fixatives or mordants, are chemical substances used in processing fabrics to create circumstances in the micro-substrates causing dye molecules to adhere and remain that way.
- Fixative (drawing), a liquid usually sprayed over a finished piece of artwork to better preserve it and prevent smudging
- Fixation (histology), a solution used to preserve or harden fresh tissue of cell specimens for microscopic examination
- Fixative (perfumery), a substance used to reduce the evaporation rate and improve stability when added to more volatile components
- Embalming chemicals, a variety of preservatives, sanitising and disinfectant agents, and additives used in modern embalming
- Photographic fixer
- Radioactivity fixatives, specialized polymer coatings used to contain or "fix" radionuclides to surfaces of equipment and buildings thereby preventing exposure to humans
