= Antiplatyhelmintic agent =

Type of antiparasitic drug

An antiplatyhelmintic agent is a type of anthelmintic designed to reduce flatworm infection.
