= Radioactivity fixatives =

Radioactivity or radionuclide fixatives are specialized polymer coatings used to “fix” radioactive isotopes or radioactive material to surfaces. These fixatives, also known as permanent coatings in the radioactive contamination control field, have been used for many decades in facilities processing radioactive material to control radioactive contamination. There has been increased interest in these fixatives or coatings recently due to the growing concern of contamination from a radioactivity dispersal device (RDD also known as a dirty bomb) and because radioactivity fixatives in use today lose the ability to contain the radioactivity to the surface during a fire.

Radioactivity fixatives reduce or eliminate the movement of radionuclides from surfaces thereby lowering the health risk of inhalation or other exposure to radioactive isotopes. There are many articles on the use of radioactive fixatives with a review article from 1983 often used as a reference. A more recent review article looks at the use of these radioactive fixatives for use after the detonation of a RDD. Current research is investigating new coatings that are effective at containing radioactive material to the surface during and after fires.
