= Hyperprolactinemic SAHA syndrome =

- Specialty: Dermatology

Hyperprolactinemic SAHA syndrome is a cutaneous condition characterized by lateral hairiness, oligomenorrhea, and sometimes acne, seborrhea, FAGA I, and even galactorrhea.

== See also ==
- SAHA syndrome
- List of cutaneous conditions
