= Caustic =

Caustic most commonly refers to:

- Causticity, the property of being able to corrode organic tissue
  - Sodium hydroxide, sometimes called caustic soda
  - Potassium hydroxide, sometimes called caustic potash
  - Calcium oxide, sometimes called caustic lime

Caustic may also refer to:

- Caustic (band), an American industrial/powernoise band
- Caustic (mathematics), the envelope of rays reflected or refracted by a manifold
- Caustic (optics), optic phenomenon due to light rays reflecting/refracting through curved surfaces/objects
- Caustic Graphics, a graphics technology developer, part of Imagination Technologies
- Caustic Window, an alias of Aphex Twin (electronic musician Richard D. James)
- A playable character in the battle royale game Apex Legends
