= Cholinesterase reactivator =

Chemical compound

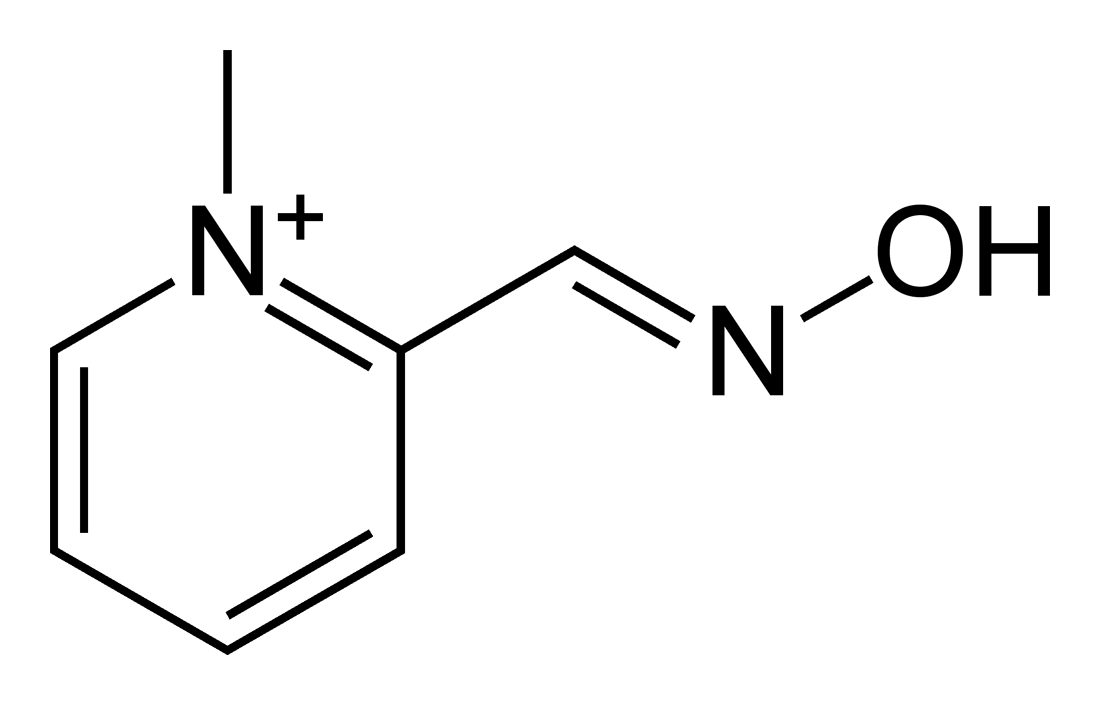
Pralidoxime molecule

Cholinesterase reactivators are drugs that reverse the inhibition of cholinesterase by organophosphates or sulfonates. They are used as antidote for treating organophosphate insecticide and nerve agent poisoning. Organophosphates are used industrially in agricultural pesticides, and globally as agents of chemical warfare.

Cholinesterase reactivators are indicated for anticholinesterase toxicity and cholinergic crisis, the signs of which are contained within the mnemonic DUMBELS : Diarrhea/diaphoresis, urinary frequency, miosis, bronchospasm/bronchorrhea, emesis, lacrimation, and salivation. Death may occur due to the blockage of nicotinic receptors of muscle fibers at the neuromuscular junction, causing paralysis of the muscles of respiration.

Discovered in 1955, Pralidoxime was the first cholinesterase reactivator used as an antidote to OP neurotoxicity and remains the most commonly used reactivator.

== Mechanism of action ==
Acetylcholinesterase Inhibitors

Organophosphates lead to toxicity by forming a strong covalent bond in the active site of AChE. OPs phosphorylate the serine residue in the active site of AChE, irreversibly inhibiting the enzyme, thereby allowing acetylcholinesterase to accumulate in the synaptic cleft of ACh receptors.

=== Oximes ===
Drugs in the oxime class (e.g., pralidoxime) reactivate AChE by removing the OP. Oximes have a higher affinity for phosphorylation than the serine residue in the AChE active site, causing the OP to detach from the AChE enzyme, freeing its active site and restoring function. After the OP detaches from AChE, it phosphorylates the oxime, forming an OP-oxime compound that hydrolyzes within the synapse.

Because oximes function primarily at nicotinic receptors, it must be co-administered with a muscarinic antagonist such as atropine. Nicotinic symptoms relieved by Pralidoxime include muscle weakness and paralysis.

=== The problem of aging ===
Some organophosphates cause an internal dealkylation reaction following the phosphorylation, leading to the formation of an oxyanion on the phosphoryl group. This is generally known as "aging". Oximes are ineffective in dislodging this kind of phosphoryl groups. Reactivation of aged cholinesterase remains an active area of research.

== Guideline recommendations ==
In the treatment of organophosphate toxicity, cholinesterase reactivators such as pralidoxime reactivate inhibited AChE at peripheral nicotinic receptors. Since AChE mediates effects on both nicotinic and muscarinic receptors, cholinesterase reactivators are co-administered with muscarinic antagonists, primarily atropine. Atropine resolves OP-induced cholinergic toxicity at muscarinic receptors in addition to aiding in central nervous system signs like bradycardia, respiratory depression, and bronchoconstriction.

Pralidoxime should be administered within 24 to 48 hours of OP poisoning, after which point the strong covalent bond of OP in the active site of AChE may be completely irreversible.

- Within 48 hours of noted acetylcholine excess administer:
  - Initial loading dose of Atropine: 2 mg intravenous (IV) infusion, repeating as needed for continuing signs and symptoms
  - Pralidoxime: 1-2 g IV, followed by continuous infusion at a rate of 200-400 mg per hour.

== See also ==
- Acetylcholinesterase inhibitor
- Nerve agent
