= Antitrichomonal agent =

An antitrichomonal agent is an antiprotozoal agent that acts on Trichomonas parasites.

Examples include:

- furazolidone
- nifuratel
- nimorazole
- ornidazole
- tinidazole
- usnic acid
