= Michael Welland =

Michael Welland (1946 – October 2017) was a British petroleum geologist and sand expert and arenophile. His book Sand: a journey through science and the imagination won the 2010 John Burroughs Medal. Welland was a featured commentator in the documentary film "Sand Wars" (2013).

Welland was born in 1946, son of Dennis Welland, Professor of American Literature and later Pro Vice Chancellor of the University of Manchester. He was educated at Manchester Grammar School and Selwyn College, Cambridge. His 1972 PhD thesis dealt with the stratigraphy and structural geology of part of the eastern Othris Mountains in Greece. His PhD supervisor was Alan Gilbert Smith.

When Welland appeared in 2010 on the BBC Radio 4 programme The Museum of Curiosity, his proposed donation to the imaginary museum was singing sand dunes.

== Selected publications ==
- The Desert: lands of lost borders (2015, Reaktion Books: ISBN 9781780233604)
- Sand: a journey through science and the imagination (2009, Oxford UP: ISBN 9780199563180; published in United States as Sand: the never-ending story)
