= Alan Gilbert Smith =

English geologist (1937–2017)

Alan Gilbert Smith FGS (24 February 1937 – 13 August 2017) was an English geologist, stratigrapher, and pioneer of plate tectonic reconstruction.

== Education and career ==
Smith was born in Watford, and went to school at Watford Grammar School for Boys. Smith went to university at St John's College, Cambridge, and graduated in 1959 with a B.A. in natural sciences. From 1959 to 1963 he was a graduate student in geology at Princeton University, where he completed a PhD thesis on the Structure and stratigraphy of the northwest Whitefish Range, Lincoln County, Montana under the supervision of John C. Maxwell (1914–2006) and Franklyn B. Van Houten (1914–2010). In 1963, Smith was appointed as a research assistant to Edward Bullard in the Department of Geodesy and Geophysics of the University of Cambridge. In 1964 he was appointed a demonstrator in the same department, and lecturer in 1971. Smith retired in 2004. His doctoral students included Michael Welland.

== Research ==
Smith's Ph.D. thesis was a major contribution to stratigraphic understanding of the Belt Supergroup. Smith and his collaborators did significant research on plate tectonics, the tectonics of the Balkan peninsula (especially Greece), and the geological timescale. His 1965 paper The fit of the continents around the Atlantic, co-authored with Edward Bullard and Jim Everett has historic importance in the establishment of the validity of plate tectonics. According to Eldridge M. Moores, Smith's 1971 paper Alpine Deformation and the Oceanic Areas of the Tethys, Mediterranean, and Atlantic was "a major breakthrough in our views of the relationship between sea floor spreading, the then new-plate tectonics, and orogeny." During the 1980s, Smith collaborated with Fred Vine and Roy Livermore, the author of The Tectonic Plates Are Moving! (Oxford University Press, 2018). In 2003 Smith and co-author Kevin T. Pickering, proposed a unifying explanation for Earth's icehouse periods during the past 620 million years.

== Family ==
Smith's father was an engineer and inventor, who developed instruments for the Royal Navy during WWII. In 1962, Smith married Judy Walton, who worked for Princeton University Press at the time. She died in 2010. Smith died in 2017, and was survived by their daughter and granddaughter.

== Awards and honours ==
- 1961 – Fellow of the Geological Society of London
- 1970 – Sedgwick Prize, University of Cambridge
- 1976 – Lyell Fund, Geological Society of London
- 1981 — Bigsby Medal, Geological Society of London
- 2004 – Medal from Aristotle University of Thessaloniki for his work on the tectonics of Greece
- 2006 – Mary B Ansari Best Reference Work Award 2006 from the Geoscience Information Society (GIS) for an outstanding geoscience publication (A Geologic Time Scale 2004, edited by Felix M. Gradstein, James G. Ogg and Alan G. Smith)
- 2007 – Distinguished Career Award, International Division, Geological Society of America
- 2008 — Lyell Medal, Geological Society of London

== Selected publications ==
- Creer, K. M.; Miller, J. A.; Smith, A. Gilbert (1965). "Radiometric Age of the Serra Geral Formation". Nature. 207 (4994): 282–283. Bibcode:1965Natur.207..282C. doi:10.1038/207282a0.
- Smith, A. Gilbert; Barnes, William C. (1966). "Correlation of and Facies Changes in the Carbonaceous, Calcareous, and Dolomitic Formations of the Precambrian Belt-Purcell Supergroup". Geological Society of America Bulletin. 77 (12): 1399. doi:10.1130/0016-7606(1966)77[1399:COAFCI]2.0.CO;2. ISSN 0016-7606.
- Smith, A. Gilbert (1968). "The Origin and Deformation of Some "Molar-Tooth" Structures in the Precambrian Belt-Purcell Supergroup". The Journal of Geology. 76 (4): 426–443. Bibcode:1968JG.....76..426S. doi:10.1086/627341.
- Shagam, Reginald; Hargraves, R. B.; Morgan, W. J.; Van Houtem, F. B.; Burk, C. A.; Holland, H. D.; Hollister, L. C., eds. (January 1973). "Chapter. Estimation of Tectonic Poles of Inactive Structures by A. Gilbert Smith". Studies in Earth and Space Sciences: A Memoir in Honor of Harry Hammond Hess. Geological Society of America. pp. 23–33. doi:10.1130/MEM132-p23. ISBN 978-0-8137-1132-4.
- Smith, A. Gilbert; Briden, James C.; Drewry, G. E. (1973). "Phanerozoic World Maps" (PDF). Special Papers in Palaeontology. 12. Palaeontological Association: 1–42.
- Drewry, G. E.; Ramsay, A. T. S.; Smith, A. Gilbert (1974). "Climatically Controlled Sediments, the Geomagnetic Field, and Trade Wind Belts in Phanerozoic Time". The Journal of Geology. 82 (5): 531–553. Bibcode:1974JG.....82..531D. doi:10.1086/628005.
- Briden, J. C.; Drewry, G. E.; Smith, A. Gilbert (1974). "Phanerozoic Equal-Area World Maps". The Journal of Geology. 82 (5): 554–574. Bibcode:1974JG.....82..554B. doi:10.1086/628006.
- Smith, Alan Gilbert; Woodcock, Nigel H. (1976). "Emplacement model for some "Tethyan" ophiolites". Geology. 4 (11): 653. Bibcode:1976Geo.....4..653S. doi:10.1130/0091-7613(1976)4<653:EMFSTO>2.0.CO;2. ISSN 0091-7613.
- Smith, A. G. (1981). "Subduction and coeval thrust belts, with particular reference to North America". Geological Society, London, Special Publications. 9 (1): 111–124. Bibcode:1981GSLSP...9..111S. doi:10.1144/GSL.SP.1981.009.01.10.
- Smith, A. G.; Woodcock, N. H. (1982). "Tectonic syntheses of the Alpine-Mediterranean region: A review". Alpine-Mediterranean Geodynamics. Geodynamics Series. Vol. 7. pp. 15–38. doi:10.1029/GD007p0015. ISBN 0-87590-503-X.
- Livermore, R. A.; Vine, F. J.; Smith, A. G. (1984). "Plate motions and the geomagnetic field -- II. Jurassic to Tertiary". Geophysical Journal International. 79 (3): 939–961. Bibcode:1984GeoJ...79..939L. doi:10.1111/j.1365-246X.1984.tb02878.x.
- Livermore, Roy A.; Smith, Alan G. (1985). "Some Boundary Conditions for the Evolution of the Mediterranean Region". Geological Evolution of the Mediterranean Basin. pp. 83–98. doi:10.1007/978-1-4613-8572-1_5. ISBN 978-1-4613-8574-5.
- Pickering, Kevin T.; Smith, Alan G. (1995). "Arcs and backarc basins in the Early Paleozoic lapetus Ocean". Island Arc. 4 (1): 1–67. Bibcode:1995IsArc...4....1P. doi:10.1111/j.1440-1738.1995.tb00132.x.
- Smith, A. G. (1997). "Estimates of the Earth's spin (Geographic) axis relative to Gondwana from glacial sediments and paleomagnetism". Earth-Science Reviews. 42 (3): 161–179. Bibcode:1997ESRv...42..161S. doi:10.1016/S0012-8252(96)00047-5.
- Smith, A.G. (1999). "Gondwana: Its shape, size and position from Cambrian toTriassic times". Journal of African Earth Sciences. 28 (1): 71–97. Bibcode:1999JAfES..28...71S. doi:10.1016/S0899-5362(99)00020-2.
- Smith, Alan G. (2000). "2. Paleomagnetically and Tectonically Based Global Maps for Vendian to Mid-Ordovician Time". The Ecology of the Cambrian Radiation. pp. 11–46. doi:10.7312/zhur10612-002. ISBN 978-0-231-10613-9.
- Smith, A. G. (2006). "Tethyan ophiolite emplacement, Africa to Europe motions, and Atlantic spreading". Geological Society, London, Special Publications. 260 (1): 11–34. Bibcode:2006GSLSP.260...11S. doi:10.1144/GSL.SP.2006.260.01.02.
- Briden, J. C.; Smith, A. Gilbert; Sallomy, J. T. (2007). "The Geomagnetic Field in Permo-Triassic Time". Geophysical Journal of the Royal Astronomical Society. 23: 101–117. doi:10.1111/j.1365-246X.1971.tb01805.x.
- Gibbard, Philip L.; Smith, Alan G.; Zalasiewicz, Jan A.; Barry, Tiffany L.; Cantrill, David; Coe, Angela L.; Cope, John C. W.; Gale, Andrew S.; Gregory, F. John; Powell, John H.; Rawson, Peter F.; Stone, Philip; Waters, Colin N. (2008). "What status for the Quaternary?". Boreas. 34: 1–6. doi:10.1111/j.1502-3885.2005.tb01000.x.
- Smith, Alan G. (2009). "Neoproterozoic timescales and stratigraphy". Geological Society, London, Special Publications. 326 (1): 27–54. Bibcode:2009GSLSP.326...27S. doi:10.1144/SP326.2.
- Smith, A. G. (2012). "A review of the Ediacaran to Early Cambrian ('Infra-Cambrian') evaporites and associated sediments of the Middle East". Geological Society, London, Special Publications. 366 (1): 229–250. Bibcode:2012GSLSP.366..229S. doi:10.1144/SP366.12.
- Smith, Alan G. (2013). "A Possible Influence of Tethyan Ophiolite Emplacement on North and Central Atlantic Spreading". Acta Geologica Sinica - English Edition. 87: 185–202. Bibcode:2013AcGlS..87S.185S. doi:10.1111/1755-6724.12148_3.
- Smith, Alan G.; Barry, Tiffany; Bown, Paul; Cope, John; Gale, Andy; Gibbard, Philip; Gregory, John; Hounslow, Mark; Kemp, David; Knox, Robert; Marshall, John; Oates, Michael; Rawson, Peter; Powell, John; Waters, Colin (2015). "GSSPS, global stratigraphy and correlation". Geological Society, London, Special Publications. 404 (1): 37–67. Bibcode:2015GSLSP.404...37S. doi:10.1144/SP404.8.

=== Books ===
- Harland, W. B.; Smith, A. Gilbert; Wilcock, B., eds. (1964). Phanerozic time-scale; a symposium dedicated to Professor Arthur Holmes. London: Geological Society of London. LCCN 73171998.
- Smith, A. G.; Briden, J. C. (1977). Mesozoic and Cenozoic paleocontinental maps. Cambridge University Press. ISBN 0521291178. LCCN 76014025.
- Smith, A.G.; Hurley, A.M.; Briden, J.C. (1981), Phanerozoic paleocontinental world maps, Cambridge University Press, ISBN 0521232570, LCCN 79042669
- Vine, F. J.; Smith, A. G., eds. (1981). Extensional tectonics associated with convergent plate boundaries: a Royal Society discussion. London: Royal Society. ISBN 0854031618. LCCN 81670158.
- Smith, Alan G.; Smith, David G.; Funnell, Brian M. (1994). Atlas of Mesozoic and Cenozoic coastlines. Cambridge University Press. ISBN 0521451558. LCCN 93028047.
- Smith, A. G.; Smith, D. G.; Funnell, B. M. (2004). Atlas of Mesozoic and Cenozoic Coastlines. Cambridge University Press. ISBN 978-0-521-60287-7.
- Gradstein, Felix M.; Ogg, James G.; Smith, Alan G., eds. (2004). A Geologic Time Scale 2004. Cambridge University Press. ISBN 0521781426. LCCN 2004043686.
