= Bouncing Stones =

Site/beach in Australia

Coordinates: 16°09′16.86″S 145°26′38.70″E

The Bouncing Stones site or beach is in the Daintree National Park in the far north of Queensland, Australia. The site is sacred to the Kuku Yalanji Aboriginals of the area and was an area where the women of the tribe discussed their secret women's business. The site takes its name because stones can be bounced off one another in a similar fashion to bouncing balls.

== See also ==
- Singing sand
- Sailing stones
