= Revolving rivers =

Revolving rivers are a surprising, uncommon way of sand pile growth that can be found in a few sands around the world, but has been studied in detail only for one Cuban sand from a place called Santa Teresa (Pinar del Rio province).

== Description ==
When pouring "revolving" sand on a flat surface from a fixed position, the growth of a conical pile does not occur by the common avalanche mechanism, where sand slides down the pile in a more or less random fashion. What happens is that a relatively thin "river" of flowing sand travels from the pouring point at the apex of the pile to its base, while the rest of the sand at the surface is static. In addition, the river "revolves" around the pile either in clockwise or counter-clockwise directions (looking from top) depending on the initial conditions. Actually the river constitutes the "cutting edge" of a layer of sand that deposits as a helix on the conical pile, and makes it grow. For small sandpiles, rivers are continuous, but they become intermittent for larger piles.

== History and state of the art ==
The phenomenon was observed first by E. Altshuler at the University of Havana in 1995, but at the time he assumed that it was well known, and temporarily forgot about it. In 2000, being at the University of Houston, he told K. E. Bassler, who showed a vivid interest in the matter. Embarrassingly enough, Altshuler was unable to demonstrate it before Bassler using a random sand from Houston, so he had to send him a video from Cuba after his return to the island.

Once the existence of the strange phenomenon was confirmed for everyone, E. Altshuler and a number of collaborators performed a systematic study in Havana, which was then jointly published with Bassler. Further work has been done to understand in more detail the phenomenon, and it has been found in other sands from different parts of the world. However, the connection between the physical, chemical (and possibly biological) properties of the grains in a specific sand, the nature of the inter-grain interactions, and the emergence of the revolving rivers is still an open question.

Sand from Santa Teresa is made of almost pure silicon dioxide grains with an average grain size of 0.2 mm approximately and no visible special features regarding grain shape. But in spite of its apparent simplicity, many puzzles still remain. For example, after many experiments one batch of sand may stop showing revolving rivers (just as singing sand eventually stops singing), which suggests that the decay is connected to certain properties of the surface of the grains that degrade by continued friction.

Videos of the effect are available on YouTube.
