= Geoscience Information Society =

The Geoscience Information Society (GSIS) is a nonprofit organization reflecting all aspects of the geosciences that works toward solutions to the information challenges faced by geoscience researchers. Membership in the Society reflects the different groups interested in addressing these challenges including commercial firms, academic institutions, government bodies, publishers and other related organizations, both national and international. GSIS is a member society of the American Geoscience Institute (AGI) and an associated society of the Geological Society of America (GSA).

== Founding ==
In 1965, the Geoscience Information Society was formed to “initiate, aid, and improve the exchange of information in the earth sciences through mutual cooperation and to deal with the many problems created by the explosion of literature in the geosciences, including that of the shortage of trained personnel to staff geoscience libraries.” The Society was officially incorporated in March of the following year.

Initial concerns that led to the founding of GSIS included a lack of communication among librarians handling geological collections and the status of bibliographic control in geological literature. General concerns were identified as the use of “IBM equipment” to control geological literature, to develop bibliographic control of master's theses and doctoral dissertations in geology, to conduct case studies of library habits of geologists, and to serve as a coordinator for other geology librarians to exchange ideas. Specific concerns included dissemination of hard-copy materials to working geologists, an index of field trip guidebooks and conference proceedings, review articles, services of state survey libraries, geological mapping, abstracting and indexing services, geological thesauri, and standardizing citations. At that time, the National Committee on Geology was concerned with these same issues. Also, AGI had become interested in geological documentation. The first meeting to address these concerns was an all-day panel discussion entitled “Geology Library Problems” held during the 1964 GSA Annual Meeting. The meeting arose out of a shared interest between geologists and librarians to work on their mutual problems.

There were three options considered in the formation of the society: to affiliate with a library or information organization, to affiliate with a geological or scientific organization, or to form an independent organization. Guiding principles were that anyone involved in geoscience information activities could participate and the need for communication and cooperation between everyone, information people and scientists.

One hundred invitations were sent to both information professionals and interested geologists for an organization meeting to be held November 5, 1965 at the GSA meeting in Kansas City, MO. The assembled geology and science librarians, geologists, documentalists, editors and information specialists adopted a constitution and completed the organization of an independent group whose purpose would be to initiate, aid, and improve the exchange of information in the earth sciences through mutual cooperation and to deal with the many problems created by the explosion of literature in the geosciences, including a shortage of trained personnel to staff geoscience libraries. The first officers were: Mark Pangborn as president, Harriet Smith as Secretary/President-elect, Harriet Long as Treasurer, and Ruth Bristol as “Past President.”

== History ==
GSIS was founded to “improve the exchange of information in the geosciences.” Over the years the particular concerns of the society have changed as the information needs of the members have changed. Topics of concern have included developments in formats and methods of production, evolving systems of communication, digitization of data, preservation of the literature, and handling of the data sets and sample collections. Further concerns include budgetary limitations and its effect on scholarly communication as well as the various methods of communication and that subsequent effect on the channels of information. GSIS and its members continue to address emerging information trends in the geosciences, including open access and other scholarly communications issues, such as copyright, author rights, and predatory publishers.

== Founders ==
- Ruth Bristol (Virginia Division of Mineral Resources)
- Herbert H. Hawks (Berkeley)
- Foster D. Smith (AGI)
- Ellen Freeman (Indiana University)
- Mark Pangborn (USGS)
- Florence Hendee (Ohio State University)
- Margarite Hanchey (Louisiana State University)
- Robert McAfee
- Harriet Smith Wallace (University of Illinois)
- Bill Heers (USGS)
- Dederick Ward (University of Colorado)

== Links ==
- Organizational Website
- Proceedings of the Geoscience Information Society (archive)
- Geoscience Information Society Newsletter
