= Sand equivalent test =

Soil analysis test

The sand equivalent test quantifies the relative abundance of sand versus clay in soil. It is measured by standardized test methods such as ASTM D2419, AASHTO T176, and EN 933–8. The test is used to qualify aggregates for applications where sand is desirable but fines and dust are not. A higher sand equivalent value indicates that there is less clay‐like material in a sample.

During the test, material from the test specimen that can pass through a No. 4 sieve is mixed with solutions of calcium chloride, formaldehyde and glycerin in a cylinder. The content is then left for sedimentation. After about 20 minutes, the level of clay suspension and the sand level is read on the cylinder scale.
