= Singing sand =

Phenomenon of sand that produces sound

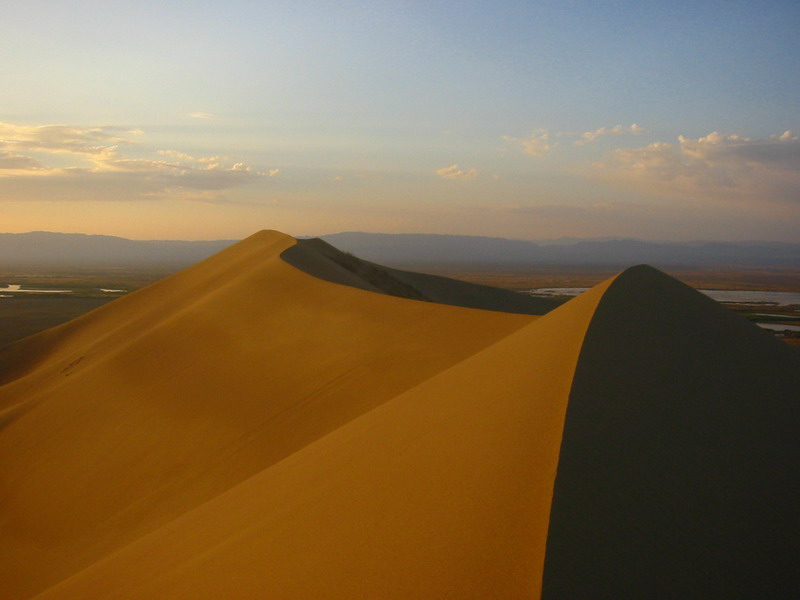
Singing sand dune in Altyn-Emel National Park, Almaty Province, Kazakhstan

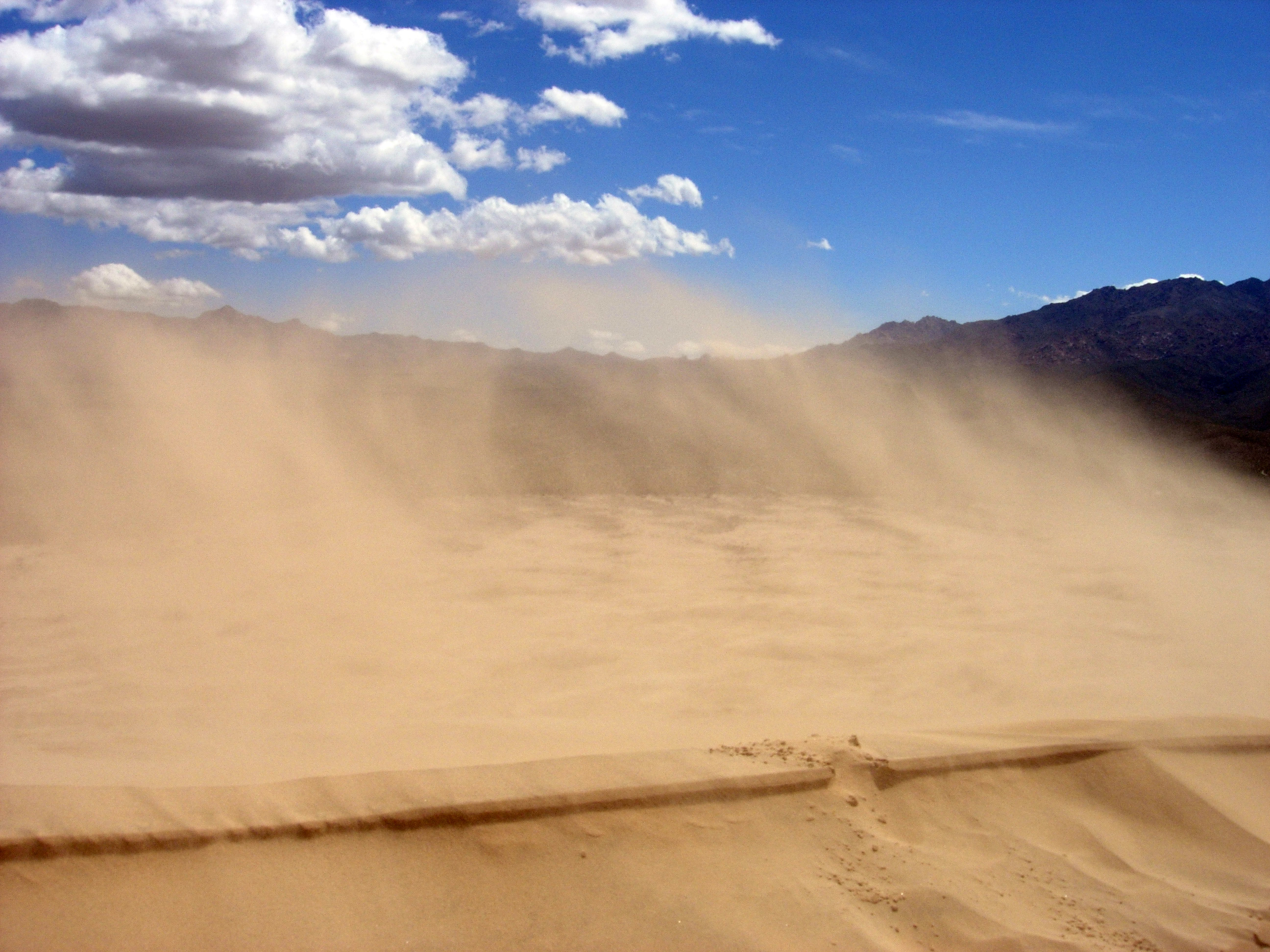
Sand blowing off a crest in the Kelso Dunes of the Mojave Desert, California

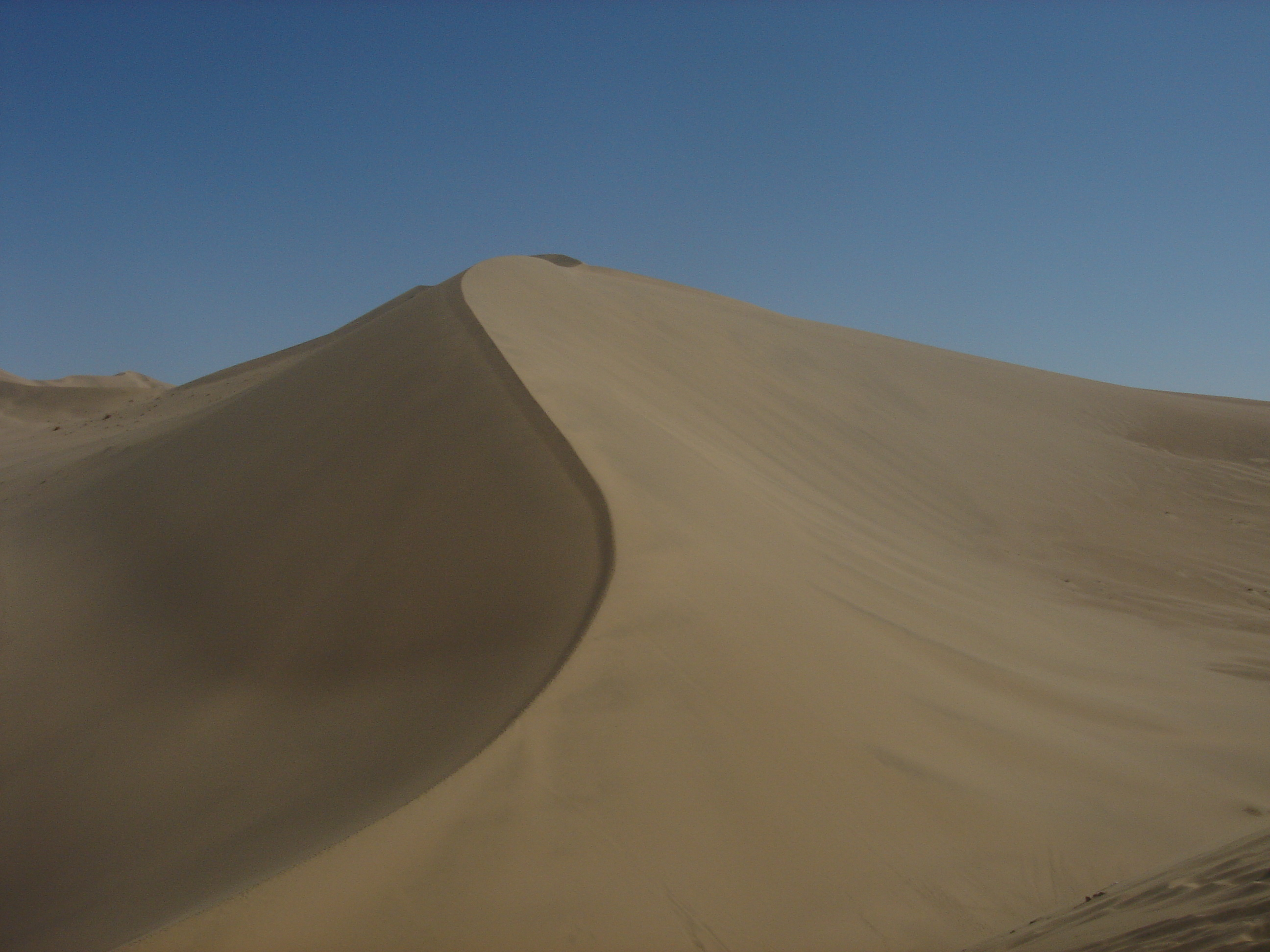
Sand dunes on the edge of Dunhuang

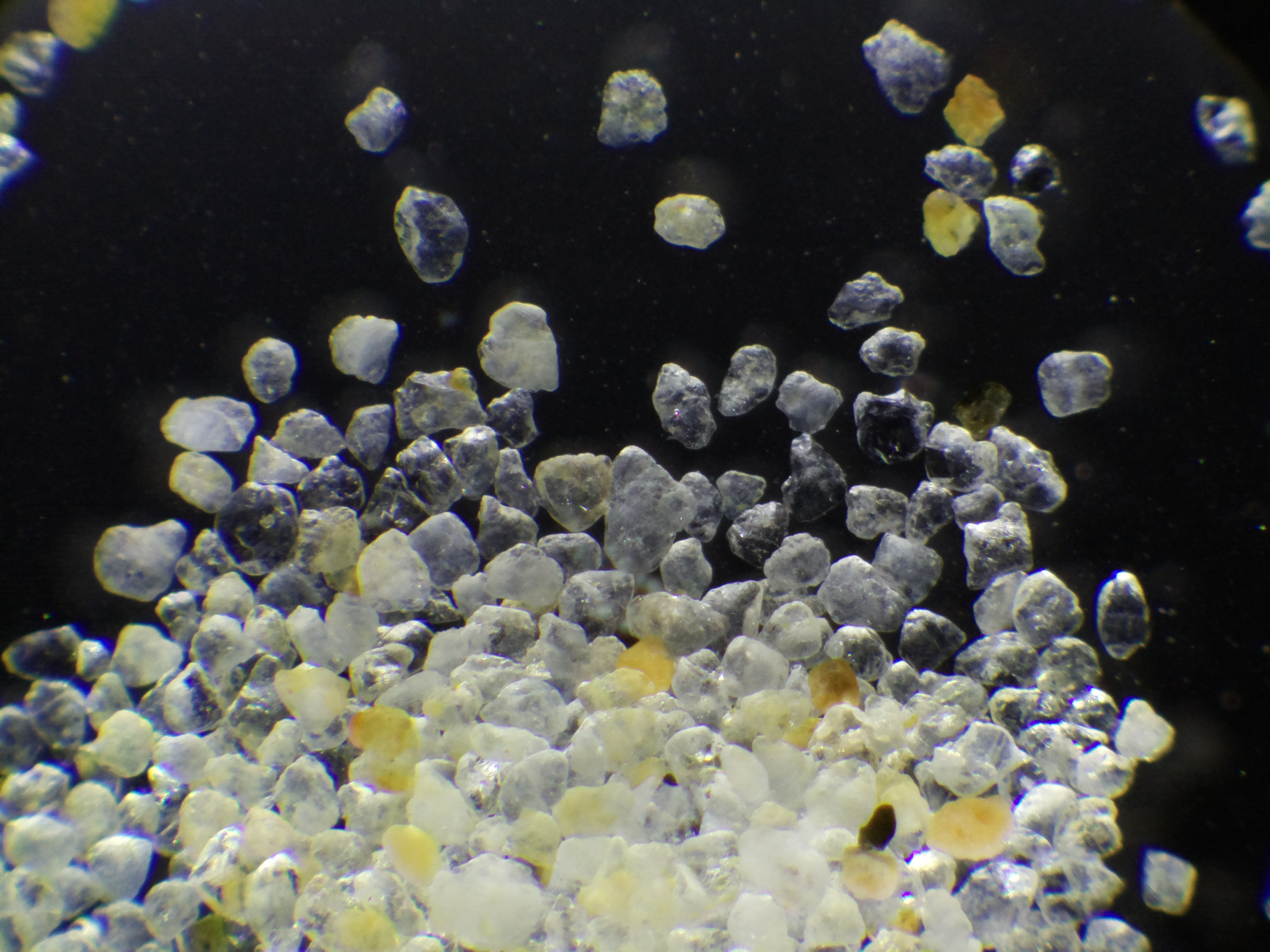
Singing sand from Gold Coast, Queensland, Australia under microscope

Singing sand, also called whistling sand, barking sand, booming sand or singing dune, is sand that produces sound. The sound emission may be caused by wind passing over dunes or by walking on the sand.

Certain conditions have to come together to create singing sand:

1. The sand grains have to be round and between 0.1 and 0.5 mm in diameter.
2. The sand has to contain silica.
3. The sand needs to be at a certain humidity.

The most common frequency emitted seems to be close to 450 Hz.

There are various theories about the singing sand mechanism. It has been proposed that the sound frequency is controlled by the shear rate. Others have suggested that the frequency of vibration is related to the thickness of the dry surface layer of sand. The sound waves bounce back and forth between the surface of the dune and the surface of the moist layer, creating a resonance that increases the sound's volume. The noise may be generated by friction between the grains or by the compression of air between them.

Other sounds that can be emitted by sand have been described as "roaring" or "booming".

== In dunes ==
Singing sand dunes, an example of the phenomenon of singing sand, produce a sound described as roaring, booming, squeaking, or the "Song of Dunes". This is a natural sound phenomenon of up to 105 decibels, lasting as long as several minutes, that occurs in about 35 desert locations around the world. The sound is similar to a loud low-pitch rumble. It emanates from crescent-shaped dunes, or barchans. The sound emission accompanies a slumping or avalanching movement of sand, usually triggered by wind passing over the dune or by someone walking near the crest.

Examples of singing sand dunes include California's Kelso Dunes and Eureka Dunes; Au Train Beach in Northern Michigan; sugar sand beaches and Warren Dunes in southwestern Michigan; Sand Mountain in Nevada; the Booming Dunes in the Namib Desert, Africa; Porth Oer (also known as Whistling Sands) near Aberdaron in Wales; Indiana Dunes in Indiana; Barking Sands Beach in Hawaiʻi; Ming Sha Shan in Dunhuang, China; Kotogahama Beach in Odashi, Japan; Singing Beach in Manchester-by-the-Sea, Massachusetts; near Mesaieed in Qatar; and Gebel Naqous, near el-Tor, South Sinai, Egypt.

The song "The Singing Sands of Alamosa" on Bing Crosby's 1947 album Drifting and Dreaming was inspired by the sand dunes near Alamosa, Colorado, now Great Sand Dunes National Park.

== On the beach ==
Walking on singing sand
Walking on singing sand at "Kotogahama" Beach in Nimacho, Odashi, Shimane, Japan, one of the 100 Soundscapes of Japan

On some beaches around the world, dry sand makes a singing, squeaking, whistling, or screaming sound if a person scuffs or shuffles their feet with sufficient force. The phenomenon is not completely understood scientifically, but it has been found that quartz sand does this if the grains are highly spherical. It is believed by some that the sand grains must be of similar size, so the sand must be well sorted by the actions of wind and waves, and that the grains should be close to spherical and have surfaces free of dust, pollution and organic matter. The "singing" sound is then believed to be produced by shear, as each layer of sand grains slides over the layer beneath it. The similarity in size, the uniformity, and the cleanness means that grains move up and down in unison over the layer of grains below them. Even small amounts of pollution on the sand grains reduce the friction enough to silence the sand.

Others believe that the sound is produced by the friction of grain against grain that have been coated with dried salt, in a way that is analogous to the way that the rosin on the bow produces sounds from a violin string. It has also been speculated that thin layers of gas trapped and released between the grains act as "percussive cushions" capable of vibration, and so produce the tones heard.

Not all sands sing, whistle or bark alike. The sounds heard have a wide frequency range that can be different for each patch of sand. Fine sands, where individual grains are barely visible to the naked eye, produce only a poor, weak sounding bark. Medium-sized grains can emit a range of sounds, from a faint squeak or a high-pitched sound, to the best and loudest barks when scuffed enthusiastically.

Water also influences the effect. Wet sands are usually silent because the grains stick together instead of sliding past each other, but small amounts of water can actually raise the pitch of the sounds produced. The most common part of the beach on which to hear singing sand is the dry upper beach above the normal high tide line, but singing has been reported on the lower beach near the low tide line as well.

Singing sand has been reported on 33 beaches in the British Isles, including in the north of Wales and on the little island of Eigg in the Scottish Hebrides. It has also been reported at a number of beaches along North America's Atlantic coast. Singing sands can be found at Souris, on the eastern tip of Prince Edward Island, at the Singing Sands beach in Basin Head Provincial Park; on Singing Beach in Manchester-by-the-Sea, Massachusetts, as well as in the fresh waters of Lake Superior and Lake Michigan and in other places.

== See also ==
- Bouncing Stones – Site/beach in Australia
- Bruce Peninsula National Park – National park in Ontario, Canada
- Colossi of Memnon – Two Ancient Egyptian statues near Luxor
- Indiana Dunes – National park in Indiana, United States
- Kelso Dunes – Dunefield in the Mojave Desert, United States
- Mistpouffers – Loud sound reported to come from the sky
- Revolving rivers
- The Hum – Low-frequency noise not audible to all people

== Literature ==
- Nori, Franco; Sholtz, Paul; Bretz, Michael (1997). "Booming Sand". Scientific American. 277 (3): 84–89. Bibcode:1997SciAm.277c..84N. doi:10.1038/scientificamerican0997-84. JSTOR 24995915.
- Sholtz, Paul; Bretz, Michael; Nori, Franco (1997). "Sound-producing sand avalanches" (PDF). Contemporary Physics. 38 (5): 329–342. Bibcode:1997ConPh..38..329S. doi:10.1080/001075197182306.
- Ridgeway, K.; Scotton, J. B. (1973). "Whistling sand beaches in the British Isles". Sedimentology. 20 (2). Wiley: 263–279. Bibcode:1973Sedim..20..263R. doi:10.1111/j.1365-3091.1973.tb02049.x. ISSN 0037-0746.
- Andreotti, B. (2004-12-01). "The Song of Dunes as a Wave-Particle Mode Locking". Physical Review Letters. 93 (23) 238001. American Physical Society (APS). Bibcode:2004PhRvL..93w8001A. doi:10.1103/physrevlett.93.238001. ISSN 0031-9007. PMID 15601204.
- Douady, S.; Manning, A.; Hersen, P.; Elbelrhiti, H.; Protière, S.; Daerr, A.; Kabbachi, B. (2006-07-07). "Song of the Dunes as a Self-Synchronized Instrument". Physical Review Letters. 97 (1) 018002. American Physical Society (APS). arXiv:nlin/0412047. Bibcode:2006PhRvL..97a8002D. doi:10.1103/physrevlett.97.018002. ISSN 0031-9007. PMID 16907409. S2CID 19628505.
- Bonneau, L.; Andreotti, B.; Clément, E. (2007-01-08). "Surface elastic waves in granular media under gravity and their relation to booming avalanches". Physical Review E. 75 (1) 016602. American Physical Society (APS). arXiv:cond-mat/0601584. Bibcode:2007PhRvE..75a6602B. doi:10.1103/physreve.75.016602. ISSN 1539-3755. PMID 17358270.
- Vriend, Nathalie M.; Hunt, Melany L.; Clayton, Robert W.; Brennen, Christopher Earls; Brantley, Katherine S.; Ruiz-Angulo, Angel (2007-08-23). "Solving the mystery of booming sand dunes". Geophysical Research Letters. 34 (16). American Geophysical Union (AGU): L16306. Bibcode:2007GeoRL..3416306V. doi:10.1029/2007gl030276. ISSN 0094-8276.
- Andreotti, B.; Bonneau, L.; Clément, E. (2008-04-23). "Comment on "Solving the mystery of booming sand dunes" by Nathalie M. Vriend et al". Geophysical Research Letters. 35 (8). American Geophysical Union (AGU): L08306. arXiv:0710.1815. Bibcode:2008GeoRL..35.8306A. doi:10.1029/2007gl032509. ISSN 0094-8276.
