= Felix M. Gradstein =

Canadian Geologist

- Born: 1941 (age 84–85); The Netherlands
- Citizenship: Canada
- Education: Utrecht University
- Occupations: Academic; scientist
- Awards: Jean Batiste Lamarck Medal (2010); Grzybowski Award (2008); Prose Awards (2013, 2017); Ansari Award (2006)
- Scientific career
- Fields: Quantitative stratigraphy Geologic time scale Micropaleontology
- Workplaces: Geological Survey of Canada; Dalhousie University; Oslo University; Portsmouth University
- Doctoral advisors: Cor Drooger

Felix M. Gradstein (born 1941, in the Netherlands) is a Dutch-Canadian academic and a pioneer in quantitative stratigraphy and geologic time scale. At the University of Utrecht, he studied paleontology and stratigraphy, obtaining his Ph.D. taking a novel biometrical approach in micropaleontology, under the supervision of Professor CW Drooger. In 1976, after working two years for an oil company in Calgary, Canada, he joined the Geological Survey of Canada in its eastern division at the Bedford Institute of Oceanography in Nova Scotia. During his research there, he was instrumental in developing a novel quantitative method for the analysis of stratigraphic events. In 1992 Felix moved to Norway where he currently has an office at the University of Oslo and is visiting research fellow at University of Portsmouth, UK. From 1985 - 1989, he was chairman of International Geoscience Project (IGCP) 181 on Quantitative Stratigraphy. From 2000 to 2008 he was chair of the International Commission on Stratigraphy (ICS) and in 2010 was instrumental in founding the Geologic Time Scale Foundation. For his fundamental work concerning the Geologic Time Scale, geochronology in general, quantitative stratigraphy, and micropaleontology, the European Geosciences Union awarded him in 2010 the Jean Baptiste Lamarck Medal. Prof. Gradstein, a world-renowned stratigrapher discussed debates over the Geologic Time Scale with the Anthropocene working Group.

As a micropaleontologist and marine stratigrapher Felix also was an active participant in expeditions of the Deep Sea Drilling Project (DSDP) and International Ocean Drilling Project (IODP). As a co-chief scientist in 1980 on DSDP Leg 76 in the Blake Bahama Basin the age of the Atlantic Ocean (~ 165 Ma) was discovered.

== Employment ==
- 2014–2017: Visiting professor, Micropaleontology/Stratigraphy Institute (ITT Fossil) of Unisinos, Sao Leopoldo, Brasil.
- 2001–2014: Professor II in Stratigraphy/Micropaleontology, Natural History Museum (NHM), University of Oslo
- 1995–2000: Senior Stratigrapher, Saga Petroleum, Norway
- 1974–1995: Senior Stratigrapher, Geological Survey of Canada
- 1972–1974: Stratigrapher, Esso, Canada

== Awards and honors ==
- Best Book Award of the Romanian Academy of Sciences (2007).

== Books ==
- Gradstein FM, Agterberg FP, Brower JC, Schwarzacher WS (1985) Quantitative stratigraphy. Reidel, Dordrecht & UNESCO, Paris, 598 pp
- Gradstein FM, Ogg J, Smith A (2004) A Geologic Time Scale. Cambridge University Press, Cambridge, 589 pp
- Gradstein, FM, Ogg, J., Schmitz, MB, Ogg, GM (rds, 2012) Geologic Time Scale 2012, two volumes, Elsevier, Amsterdam, 1144pp.
- Gradstein FM, Ogg J, Schmitz MB, Ogg GM (eds, 2020) Geologic Time Scale 2020. Two volumes, Elsevier, Amsterdam, 1357 pp
- Kaminski, M.A. and Gradstein, F.M., 2005. Atlas of Cosmopolitan Deep Water Agglutinated Foraminifera (Paleogene). Memoir, Grzybowski Foundation, 500 pp., 140 plates (book).

== Selected publications ==
- Gradstein FM (1974) Mediterranean Pliocene Globorotalia – a biometrical approach. PhD thesis, Utrecht Univ, published by Krips Repro, Meppel, Netherlands, 128 pp
- Gradstein FM, Agterberg FP (1982) Models of Cenozoic Foraminiferal Stratigraphy – Northwestern Atlantic Margin. In: Cubitt JM, Reyment RA (eds) Quantitative Stratigraphic Correlation. Wiley, New York, pp. 119–173
- Gradstein, Felix and Waskowska, Anna, 2021. New insights into the taxonomy and evolution of Jurassic planktonic foraminifera. Swiss J Palaeontol (2021) 140:1 https://doi.org/10.1186/s13358-020-0
- Felix Gradstein, Anna Waskowska and Larisa Glinskikh, 2021. The First 40 Million Years of Planktonic Foraminifera. Geosciences 2021, 11, 85. https://doi.org/10.3390/geosciences11020085
- Kent DV, Gradstein FM (1986) A Jurassic to Recent geochronology. In: Vogt PR, Tucholke (eds) The geology of North America Vol M: The Western North Atlantic Region. Geological Society of America, Boulder Colorado, pp 45–50
