= Arenophile =

Person who collects sand

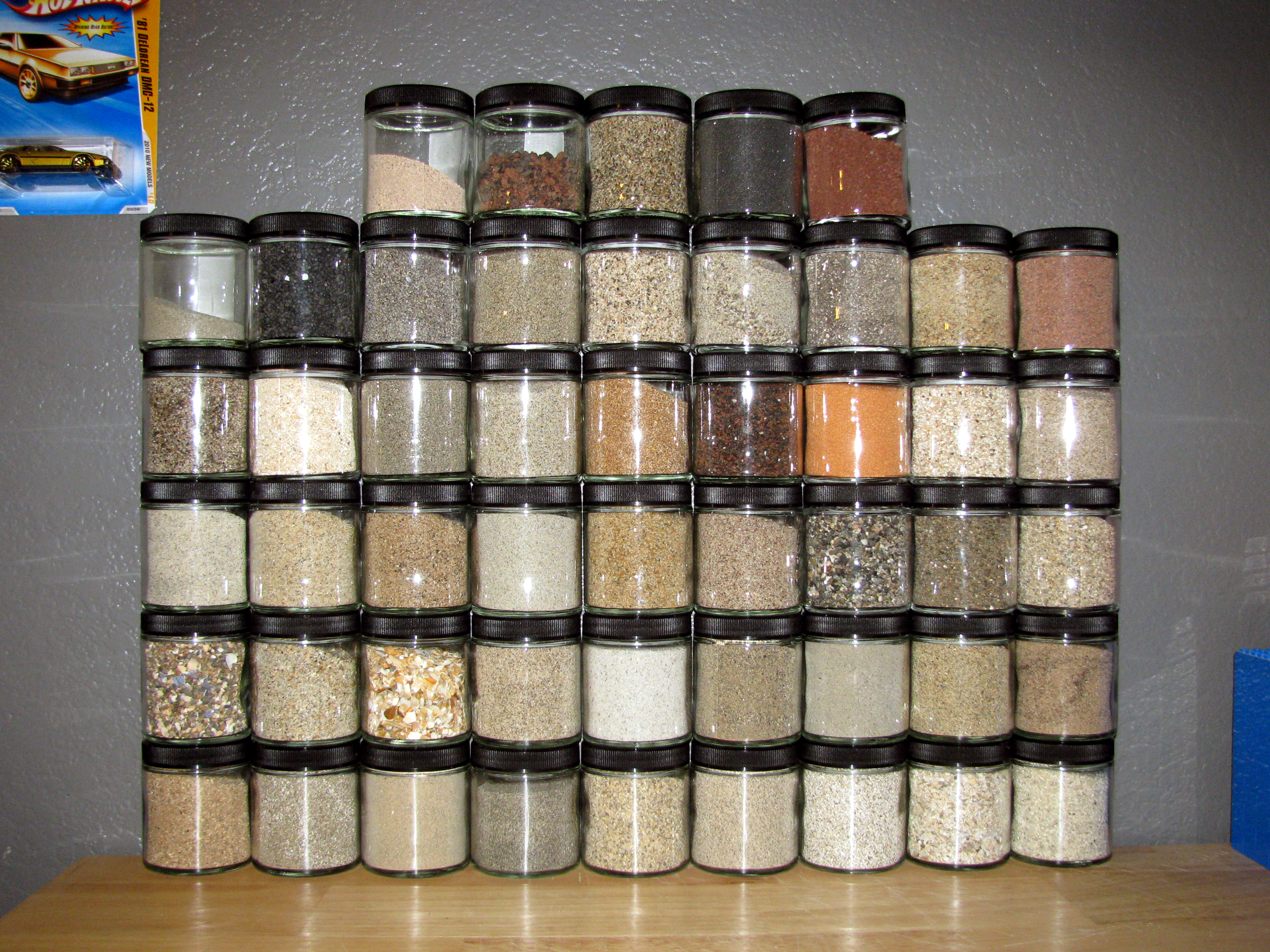
A collection of different sands

An arenophile is one who collects sand samples, the interest of the hobby lying in the variety of texture, colour, mineralogy and place of origin.

== Etymology ==
The terms arenophile meaning "sand lover" and the associated arenophilia derive from the Latin arena (sand) and the Greek phil (love). These words are not, as of 2019, included in the Oxford English Dictionary. The term Psammophile (derived from two Greek words) is also used, and found in the OED, but with reference to plants or animals rather than human collectors. The adjective arenophilic is used in biology, as in "arenophilic glands, the mucoid secretions of which attach sand grains ...".

== Collecting ==
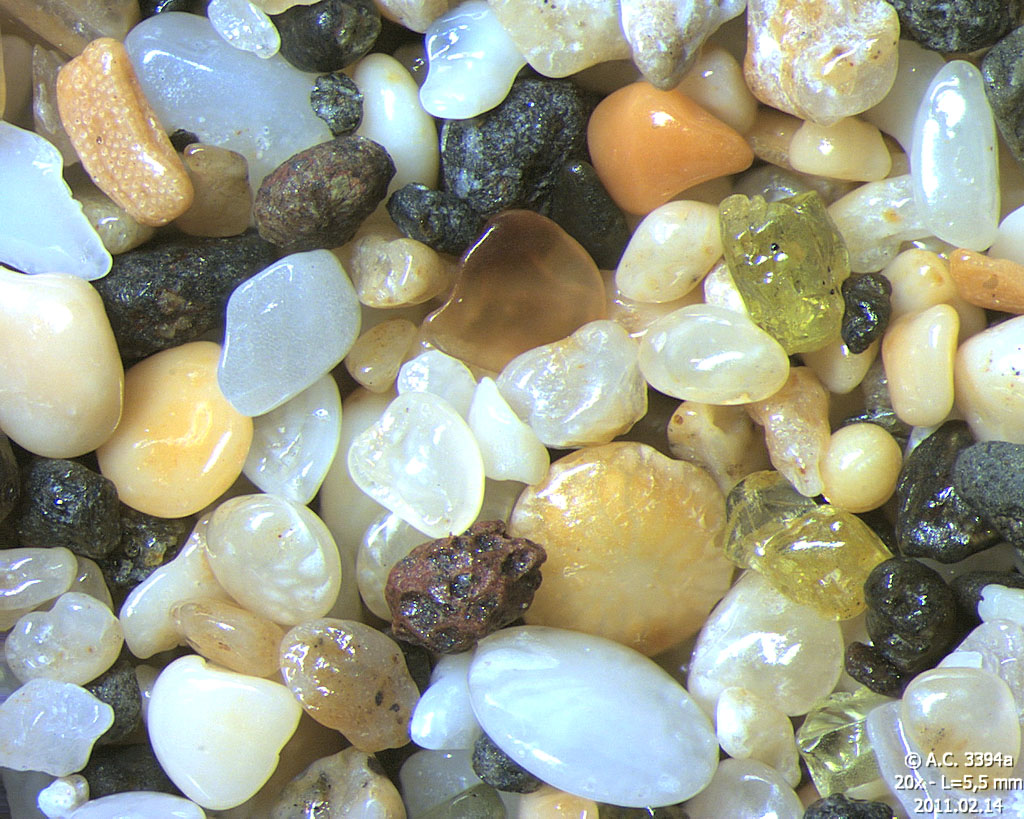
Sand from Kalalau Beach, Hawaii.(Field width = 5.5 mm) A few grains of olivine is visible, which is the green sand of some beaches of Hawaii.

According to the International Sand Collector's Society (ISCS), the hobby of sand collecting dates from at least the turn of the 20th century. Collectors may seek out sand from coastlines or the shores of rivers which hold some personal significance, or sand which is considered interesting for its unique qualities. Collecting sand involves minimal equipment, such as a shovel for digging, and containers to store the sand; good record-keeping is advised, since it can be hard to identify a sand's origin after the fact. Some collectors may trade sands with fellow arenophiles in order to complete their collection.

Sand with certain characteristics is considered rare, such as green sand found in Hawaii and Brazil. Rarity might also be derived from the remoteness of the sand's location, such as the Pitcairn Islands or Easter Island.

Sand collecting is forbidden in certain locations: as an example, the Coast Protection Act 1949 makes it illegal in Scotland to remove any quantity of sand or pebbles from beaches and shorelines. In 2019, it was reported that a French couple would face between one and six years in prison for removing 40kg (88lb) of sand from a beach in the Sardinian city of Chia. The ISCS advises its members to be mindful of where they are collecting sand and of relevant local laws.
